= Print =

Printing is a process for reproducing text and images using a master form or template.

Print or printing may also refer to:

== Publishing ==
- Canvas print, the result of an image printed onto canvas which is often stretched, or gallery-wrapped, onto a frame and displayed
- Offset printing, the inked image is transferred from a plate to a rubber blanket and then to the printing surface
- Old master print, a work of art produced by a printing process in the Western tradition
- Photographic printing, the process producing a final image on paper
- Point (typography), also known as "print" or "font size"
- Print run, all of the copies produced by a single set-up of the production equipment
- Printing press, a device for applying pressure to an inked surface resting upon a print medium
- Printmaking, the process of making artwork by printing, normally on paper
- Release print, a copy of a film that is provided to a movie theater
- Textile printing, the process of applying color to fabric in patterns or designs
- Waterless printing, an offset lithographic printing process

== Arts, entertainment, and media ==
- Print (magazine), a bimonthly magazine about visual culture and design
- Prints (album), a 2002 album by Fred Frith
- ThePrint, an Indian online newspaper

== Computing ==
- PRINT (command), the DOS command providing printer spooling capability
- PRINT (BASIC), the BASIC command mainly for outputting text on the screen
- printf, C function that formats and outputs text

== Other uses ==
- Printing (gun law), when the shape or outline of a firearm is visible through a garment
- Print Matthews (1840–1883), American sheriff who was murdered

== See also ==
- Printer (disambiguation)
- Fingerprint (disambiguation)
- Footprint (disambiguation)
- Imprint (disambiguation)
- Print shop (disambiguation)
