= Nick Shinn =

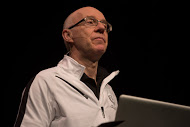
Nick Shinn

Nick Shinn (born London, England, 1952) is a typeface designer. He attended Bedford School then Leeds Polytechnic, where he earned a Dip. AD in Fine Art.

In 1976 he moved to Toronto, Canada, where he worked as an art director and creative director at a number of Toronto advertising agencies from the 1970s into the 1980s. In 1989 he started ShinnDesign, his own digital studio, specializing in publication design. Nick has designed everything from books and magazines to web sites.

Since 1980 he has designed over 20 typeface families, some for respected publishers, including Walburn and Brown for the Canadian daily "The Globe and Mail." Many of Nick's early type designs were published by various foundries, most notably the FontFont library. In 1999 he launched ShinnType, which now publishes and markets his fonts worldwide. Shinn is a prolific writer and contributed to the now defunct "Graphic Exchange" magazine, as well as many other publications. He has also had speaking engagements at conferences such as ATypI and TypeCon and has served as a board member for The Society of Typographic Aficionados.

Of his typeface designs, Shinn says, “Beautiful letters aren’t enough to make a successful typeface; I also want to create faces that are design solutions.”
