= Moshe Gershuni =

Israeli artist

Moshe Gershuni משה גרשוני
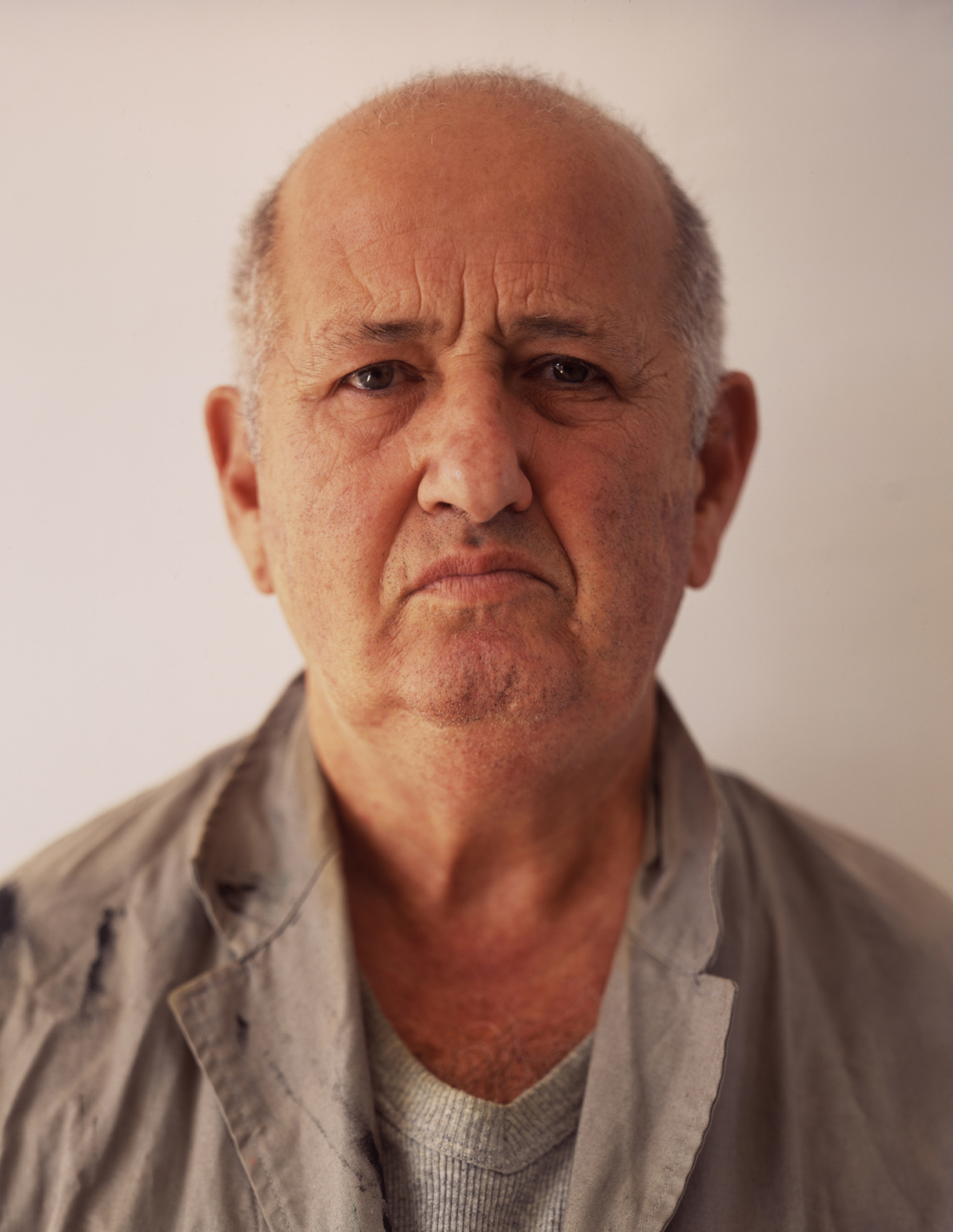
- Moshe Gershuni, 2007
- Born: 11 September 1936; Tel Aviv, Mandatory Palestine
- Died: 22 January 2017 (aged 80); Tel Aviv, Israel
- Education: Avni Institute of Art and Design, Tel Aviv
- Known for: Painting
- Movement: Israeli art

Moshe Gershuni (Hebrew: משה גרשוני; 11 September 1936 – 22 January 2017) was an Israeli painter and sculptor. In his works, particularly in his paintings from the 1980s, he expressed a position different from the norm, commemorating the Holocaust in Israeli art. In addition, he created in his works a connection between bereavement and homoerotic sexuality, in the way he criticized society and Israeli Zionism-nationalism. He was awarded the Israel Prize for Painting for his work in 2003, but in the end it was revoked and he was deprived of receiving the prize.

== Biography ==
Moshe Gershuni was born in 1936 to Yona and Zvi Kutner, who had migrated to Mandatory Palestine from Poland. Zvi, the head of the family, who was an agronomist and farmer, "hebraicized" the family name from Kutner to Gershuni, after his father. His mother Yona, née Senior, acted in community theater in Poland and made hats in Tel Aviv. The family lived in Tel Aviv on Hahashmal Street, and in 1939 moved to Mazeh Street. In 1938 Mira, Moshe's sister, was born, and in 1943, his brother Avshalom was born. Moshe was sent to the religious Bilu School and then continued his studies in a religious high school.

His father managed to save several family members from the Holocaust by arranging immigration certificates (certifikatim) to Mandatory Palestine, but some of his mother's relatives were murdered in the Holocaust. Gershuni described in a late interview the presence of the Holocaust in his childhood: "My mother was troubled all the rest of her life that she had not succeeded in bringing them here. And, like many others, I remember the years after the war [...] I remember that I read everything I could on the subject, there were already personal accounts of it on the radio, in private conversations, from the relatives who arrived. [...] it was in my consciousness, it was almost the center of my consciousness, in spite of the fact that my early years included the founding of the State and the war with the Arabs, but everything was a function of that experience."

In 1952 the family moved from Tel Aviv to Herzliya, near to the family-owned orchards, in the Gan Rashal area. In 1954, Gershuni's induction into the army was postponed by half a year because he was underweight, but the date of induction in 1955 was also postponed by the death of his father in an auto accident. Gershuni took over his father's job in the orchards. After his father's death Gershuni began to move into the world of art. The painter Leon Fouturian and the sculptor Uri Shoshany, both residents of Herzliya, influenced him. From 1960 to 1964 he studied sculpture in night courses at Avni Institute of Art and Design, after days spent working in the orchards. His teachers were Dov Feigin and Moshe Sternschuss, members of the "New Horizons" group, which during these years was beginning to lose the central place it had held in the world of Israeli art.

In 1964 he married Bianca Eshel, who was also a student in the Avni Institute and a widow of an Israeli Air Force pilot who had been killed in the Sinai Campaign. After the wedding the couple moved to Ra'anana. In addition to Eshel's daughter from her first marriage, a son, Aram Gershuni, was born to them in 1967 and a second son, Uri Gershuni, in 1970.

=== From "Pre-Conceptual" Art to "Post-Minimalist" Art, 1969–79 ===
==== Presence, Absence, Body ====
Gershuni's artistic path began with abstract sculpture, strongly influenced by pop art. His first solo exhibition was mounted in 1969 in the Israel Museum. On the walls of the museum were hung yellowish green abstract paintings in a geometric style, and throughout the space of the exhibition itself were strewn objects made of soft materials influenced by the sculptor Claes Oldenburg.

In the 1970s Gershuni produced a series of works influenced by the conceptual art of Europe and America. Yona Fischer who, in his position as Curator of the Israel Museum during those years, encouraged these trends, in retrospect stated that "the understanding that conceptual activity was what was developing here was not yet fully focused." As the influence of conceptual art, particularly American conceptual art, seeped in, "post-minimalist" art, which was concerned with examining the material values of art (Formalism), while attempting to strengthen the status of artistic activity, began to develop in Israel. In addition, this type of art emphasized the ontological dimension of artistic works. Instead of objectives with a commercial aesthetic, this genre adopted a freer relationship with minimalist values and emphasized the exposure of the process of the artist at work. At the same time, it examined and subverted the values of society about its political and social views.

Gershuni's first important works made use of automobile tires ("Inner Tubes"). The use of this material constituted a continuation of his preoccupation with soft materials, but Gershuni introduced new characteristics which had been absent in his work before. In "The Spirit is Willing, But the Flesh is Weak" (1969), for example, Gershuni exhibited inner tubes lined up in a row along a wall. The title of the work, taken from "Gospel of Matthew (Matthew 26:41)," referred to the gap between the body and the spirit, and between the perception of reality and human consciousness. A similar work was exhibited in 1970 in the "Group Autumn Exhibition" in the Helena Rubenstein Pavilion for Contemporary Art. Gershuni created a large sculptural installation called "Inner Tubes," which included rows of 64 tire inner tubes arranged in piles and creating a net ("grid") in the style of minimalist art. The work received broad public exposure because of a television reporter on Channel 1 who visited the exhibition and focused on Gershuni's sculpture as an uncompromisingly curious object.

Another work that shows Gershuni's ironic relationship with the grid is "Margarine Cubes on Paper" (1970). The work documented, in effect, an activity in which margarine cubes melted into the paper, while emphasizing the sensual aspect of the material. A reinforcement of this tendency can be seen in two videos Gershuni prepared for a television show created by Jacques Katmor for Israeli Television. In the video clip "Crawling" (1970; 32 seconds, black and white), Gershuni implemented an activity of signing with his body. He is photographed dressed in an Israeli army uniform, crawling over a dune in two opposing directions that are combined with one another. In this way, a kind of sign, in the form of an X was formed. This activity was described in retrospect by Ilana Tannenbaum as an act of ars poetica, which voids and cancels out the action it performs, at the same time as it makes an ironic statement about the Israeli military. Another work that was shown on the program included the covering up or sealing of the television screen "from the inside" with black paint.

Another series of works, also from 1970, is a series of drawings on fragments of paper, with names like "The Paper Looks White, but Inside, Within, It Is Black." In these works Gershuni emphasizes the edges of the paper by tearing it or blackening it. These actions, according to Gershuni, were intended to show "that paper has thickness, that it is three-dimensional." By pointing out the interior dimension of the paper, Gershuni was trying to indicate – ironically – the "beyond," that is the transcendental dimension of art.

In the group of works that Gershuni created during the first half of the decade, content that diverged from questions of the characteristics of pure artistic representation began to appear. At the same time, Gershuni preserved the characteristics of form within conceptual art, that is, its arrangement in series, the use of text, and the reflexive dimension of the works. Among the new characteristics that appeared in his works was a whole series of clearly biographical references, both to the artist and to his family. In his work "My Father My Grandfather" (1970), for example, which was displayed in the exhibition entitled "Concept Plus Information" at the Israel Museum (Yona Fischer, Curator) in 1971, Gershuni hung an enlarged family photograph with a circle drawn around the head of his paternal grandfather. Next to the photograph was a caption that read, "My Old Man, Moshe the Son of So-and-So, Woodcarver. Plotzk, Poland, 1910." In the 1974 "Benedictus" exhibition at the Yodfat Gallery in Tel Aviv, another work that made use of family photographs was exhibited. Under three photographs of his father and Red Army insignia, Gershuni attached a text printed on paper which said "My father was born in Poland and studied agriculture in France. He made aliyah to the Land of Israel in 1929. Planted trees." The relationship between the images and the written texts were created, according to the later interpretation of Gideon Ofrat, pointed towards a disconnect between space and time, and between the Europe in which his grandfather lived and the Land of Israel in which Gershuni lived. The gap between the past and the present appears once again in his installation "Cypresses/Memories" (1971), which was displayed in The Artists House Tel Aviv, and which showed photographs from his childhood arranged on cut-down cypresses.

The series of photographs entitled "The Main (Real) Problems are with the Tongue and the Toes" (1972) reveals Gershuni's interest in the body and corporeality as a topic of knowledge. In these self-portraits, Gershuni creates portraits by "mugging" in front of the camera, in a way that is parallel to contemporary American artists, such as Bruce Nauman, Vito Acconci, etc. The photographs of his face focus on Gershuni's mouth and focus on the relationship between the surface and the gaping space. In the photographs of his legs, Gershuni continues with an examination of the relationship by exposing the toes of his feet through yellow paper.

==== "The Problem of Painting is The Palestinian Problem" ====
Following the lead of Yitzhak Danziger, the spiritual father of many young artists of the 1970s, Gershuni participated in several performance art installations, which were called in those days "activities." "You could say we were 'Danziger's Boys'," Gershuni related, "in the early 1970s, during the period when he was working in the Nesher quarry and was carrying out all of his experiments. That was during the time when he hung the wheat in the museum, all that experimental direction that was exactly in the spirit of what we were looking for."[11] These activities, that were political and social in nature, Gershuni developed in a kind of group that worked in the Hadera area, and which included Micha Ullman, Avital Geva, and Yehezkel Yardeni. The group made sure they had regular meetings with Danziger in Haifa and Tel Aviv and participated in tours he organized.

Among the group of projects the group carried out, called the "Metzer-Messer Project" (1972), Gershuni took photographs of the landscapes of Kibbutz Metzer, called "a meeting of the kibbutz members", and "gave away" the kibbutz lands to these members. His colleague, the artist Micha Ullman, carried out an exchange of land between the Arab village of Messer and the neighboring kibbutz, and Geva organized books that were sent to recycling to Amnir Recycling Industries and set up an improvised libraries, among other things. The social dimension of these activities emphasized the work methods of art as an element in social progress. "In those days I used to say I didn't need a studio because I created products."

In 1972 Gershuni began to teach in the Department of Fine Arts of "Bezalel." He was considered one of the central teachers, who supported experimental and political art. The "political discourse" of that period, according to Itamar Levy, "ran parallel to the formalist discourse." An example of the political involvement can be found in a 1974 manifesto which includes artistic declarations, such as combining different artistic disciplines and putting an emphasis on work processes, along with a political petition from Bezalel's teachers and pupils, including Gershuni, which called for the formation of an investigative committee to examine the government's "failure" in the Yom Kippur War. In 1977, in connection with the "academization" of Bezalel, events reached a peak which included a series of strikes by the department and the students. Among the activities that Gershuni carried out with his pupils during this period was writing inscriptions that read "The painting problem is the Palestinian problem" and spreading them around the streets of Jerusalem. Because of the "rebellion" half of the teachers in the department were fired, among them Gershuni and Micha Ullman, who were considered the principal supporters of the students. In 1978 Gershuni began to teach at HaMidrasha - The Art Teachers Training College in Ramat Hasharon, where he continued to teach until 1986.

In 1978 Gershuni exhibited his work in a large group exhibition called "Artist-Society-Artist" at the Tel Aviv Museum of Art. The version of his work "A Gentle Hand" that he displayed there included a newspaper article called "The Story of Joseph Ziad as Told to Leroy Frizen", describing abuse of a Palestinian doctor at the hands of Israeli soldiers, and including a voice recording on which he sings the song "A gentle hand" by Zalman Shneur, that was broadcast from a loudspeaker on the roof of the museum like a muezzin. In the catalog, Gershuni gave an explanation of the work that dealt both with internal politics and his own personal feelings:

"If I say that the song is 50 years old and that its source is from a certain period of settlement and a certain period of Zionism, will that mean anything? The song has emotional significance for me. The melody has Eastern motifs. I sing it the way I remember Ilka Raveh singing it in a night club in Jaffa, and he sang the way they once used to sing, during the time of enthusiasm for things Eastern, when they were still trying to be influenced by the East. On the soundtrack that appears here it's as though I'm sitting there and teaching myself how I ought to sing "A Gentle Hand."

=== Red Sealing, 1979–80 ===
In 1979 a solo exhibition entitled "Little Red Sealings" opened at the "Sarah Levy Gallery." The exhibition included paper and photographs that had been treated with red paint, a color which was to become significant in Moshe Gershuni's work in the coming years. The works exhibited a number of artistic influences by citing the names of artists such as the Italian sculptor Medardo Rosso, the Israeli painter Aviva Uri, etc.

A group of his works included imagery taken from iconic art works. In an untitled work (1980) Gershuni stained a portrait of the Pope in red. In addition Gershuni added many-legged graphic symbols that were reminiscent of swastikas. This symbol appears several times, including on the groin of the Pope. In another untitled work from the same year Gershuni drew on a reproduction of a portrait of Bernard Van Orley (1521) by Albrecht Dürer.[16] Gershuni covered the face with transparent blue paint, like a kind of veil, and he drew on the lapel of his black garment a Star of David the edges of which were stained in red. Itamar Levy described in retrospect Moshe Gershuni's act of creating that painting as a test of his relationship to painting. "In Gershuni's treatment the portrait turns into dirt, the dirt is makeup, the makeup is makeup in blood. In Gershuni's treatment, the painting turns into the arena for an enraged attack on the painting. And the world that surrounds the man becomes a woman adorned, an object of lust, perhaps of forbidden passion.

Along with these personal works, Gershuni created works that had a direct social and political message. In a series of works entitled "Arik Sharon and the Indians" (1979), Gershuni made use of a pickup truck with a man holding a rifle sitting on it. Gershuni imposed red markings on them and a hand-written caption with the name of the work. In his work "Golda Meir" (1979) Gershuni wrote the name of Prime Minister Golda Meir on a portrait of the queen from the painting by Francisco Goya, "Charles IV of Spain and His Family" and gave the painting a red frame made up of paint smudges. In other works of this period Gershuni colored the edges of the paper with red paint, staining them and adding texts like "Hello, Soldier" or "I'm coming."

His works of this period were a series of installations that distanced themselves from the serious nature of his earlier works. In 1979 Gershuni exhibited the caption "Who's Zionist and Who Isn't?" on the walls of the Julie M. Gallery in Tel Aviv. In this exhibition large letters were written on the walls of the gallery in pastel chalks and lit up with strong, hot lighting.

In 1980 Gershuni exhibited an installation called "Blood of My Heart" in the Tel Aviv Museum of Art. The installation included 150 white porcelain plates stained with red paint. Gershuni continued in this artistic vein in an installation called "Red Sealing/Theater" which was displayed in the Israeli Pavilion in the 1979 Venice Biennale. In this year Gershuni carried out an activity involving the sealing of the cracks in the space of the pavilion with red paint and then added objects connected to his own biography. This act of sealing in his work, in Gershuni's eyes, was meant to be interpreted as a sign of the reverberating presence of a burden that could not be eliminated. In the end, Gershuni presented the work "as a murder scene." Amnon Barzel, curator of the exhibition, described the work as a transcendental description contrasting the activity of nature to the activity of man. However, a quote from Gershuni explains it as a cry against the injustice of the world: "I am calling my work 'Theater'," Gershuni wrote, "because of my doubt that a work of art, or the color red, can call sufficient attention to life or react to it sufficiently [...] The cry of the individual is the only justification for society, and works of art are the only excuse for continuing to live in injustice and wars."

These works presented a variety of new images, and therefore a conspicuous Iconographic development, in Gershuni's work. Furthermore, they abandoned the minimalist character of his works up until this time.

At the end of this decade Gershuni went through a depression and a deep identity crisis. It was during this period that Gershuni also came to terms with his homosexuality. In 1981, after several sexual experiments with men, Gershuni left his family and Ra'anana for an apartment and studio on Yosef ha-Nasi Street in Tel Aviv-Yafo. It was during this period also that he met Yitzhak, his partner until the mid-1990s.

=== "Soldiers in a Cabaret, 1980–82 ===
In the beginning of the 1980s Gershuni abandoned "Post-minimalist" sculpture and the conceptual approach in order to create a series of paintings. Gershuni received encouragement for the continuation of his creative life within the framework of psychological therapy he was receiving during this period. In his first works from this period paint stains appeared in red or glittering purple, with blurry outlines, produced with glass paints on glossy paper. Next to the stains appeared short titles, such as "How Are You, Soldier" (1980). After the first works, this series of works shows a growing sophistication of graphic composition. In works like "Hey, Soldier" (1980), an abstract image in yellow and muddy gray, stained with shiny red paint, floating above the glossy paper which repels the paint. In "But Where is the Lamb for a Burnt Offering" (1980), the paint stains have turned into a schematic image of an animal placed within a framework of fiery red paint stains.

Until 1981, his paintings included more identifiable images, with a specific iconography. Among the images are masculine figures in which "feminine" traits, such as exaggerated lips, appear. Other images are flags, mainly in yellow and green, and bonfires with smoking torches. The iconography of this image is connected to The Sacrifice of Isaac and the ritual sacrifice it symbolizes. he specific mention of the name Yitzhak [Isaac in English] relates also to biographical details from Gershuni's own life, to the Yitzhak who was his lover at the time or Yitzhak Danziger, who was a sort of spiritual father to him.

These paintings were done by spreading on paint with his fingers while lying on the floor next to the canvas. In many of the paintings there began to appear quotes from Israeli songs and poetic verses from the Bible, which Gershuni indicated he had sung while painting these works. The development of this style was influenced by the "Bad Painting" style which developed in Europe and America during this period.

The first exhibition of these works took place in the Givon Art Gallery in Tel Aviv and was called "Hey, Soldier." Among the works included in the exhibition were paintings entitled "Soldier! Soldier!" (1981) and "Sing Soldier" (1981). In December 1981, in the third number of the journal Kav, an article by Sarah Breitberg-Semel was published. It was called "Moshe Gershuni -- Soldiers in a Cabaret," and it discussed Gershuni's new group of works. A central place in the article was given to "I am a Soldier" (1981), which was part of this exhibition. Breitberg-Semel claimed that Gershuni's creative process was modeled by how the viewer perceived him. On one hand, the works include texts that are "confessions," as in "I am a Soldier" or "I am Vincent," while on the other hand the work displays the emphasis on the craftsmanship involved in the artistic expression represented by the use of glossy paint on paper that does not absorb the paint. For Breitberg-Semel, the change in the nature of the texts in Gershuni's work—from canonical texts related to "the beautiful, socialist Land of Israel" to texts praising the exalted nature of Creation along with "passages of mourning concerned with death" – were a sign of a collapse of the view of one world view, militaristic and solid, and its replacement by "a complex point of view, open and lacking a solution, of existential questions, accompanied by mystical yearnings."

On the cover of the fourth issue of the 1982 volume of Kav (November 1982) was a reproduction of Gershuni's painting "Isaac, Isaac, With Great Pity I have Loved You" (1982). Inside the issue appears a short text by gershuni discussing the importance of the "place" and strengthening Breitberg-Semel's interpretation. "I am a Jew," Gershuni wrote, "yes, with all the mysticism that goes along with it. I am Israeli because I am a Jew. Otherwise I have no particular reason to be here." Gershuni continued by describing his activity as an artist as "a lone soldier in the battle for the character of Israeli society."

Breitberg-Semel's article determined the dominant view of Gershuni's work during the 1980s. While this interpretation emphasized the corporeality and the sensuality of the way he painted, Gershuni's battle as a "lone soldier" was perceived in terms of nationalism. To a certain extent the homosexual aspect of his work was covered up. "During the 1980s, even drawing a soldier with an earring was unthinkable," Gershuni said in a later interview, but the covering up of the homosexual aspect was at the request of Gershuni himself, who preferred that the press did not openly publicize that he had come out of the closet due to family considerations.

=== "A Spring Day Will Come and Cyclamen Will Bloom, 1982–89" ===
In 1982-1983 Gershuni began a series of paintings that included images of the flower cyclamen. The cyclamen, according to Gershuni, represents a national motif and often appears in Hebrew poems for children. Another iconographic source is Haim Gouri's song "Bab al-Wad" (1948). In "Little Isaac, Where are You Going?" (1982), for example, on the left side of the painting there is a dark-colored scribble that looks like flower petals next to a branched system of lines, in pencil and in paint, creating images that look like a fire, like a question mark, etc. In 1983 the cyclamen can be discerned as a clear image, but the range of colors becomes darker. In addition, Gershuni begins to include in his works symbols of alienation and exile – "Yitzhak" (Isaac) becomes "Yitzhakeleh" and swastikas begin to appear. In 1984 Gershuni created the series "Hai Cyclamens," (18 Cyclamens) which was exhibited in the Givon Gallery in 1984. The series is composed of 18 paintings, each of which is spread over 2 sheets of paper held together by tape, making them 140 X 200 cm total in size. Besides the images of flower petals and cyclamen petals, which form a thick, upward-pointing tangle, quotations from Gouri's song also appear in the paintings and a number of verses from Psalms 103: "who forgives all your sins and heals all your diseases, who redeems your life from the pit and crowns you with love and compassion." These verses are arranged around the edges of the paintings as a sort of frame.

Yigal Zalmona described the motif of the cyclamen in Gershuni's work as a replacement for the soldier. As a combination of voluptuousness and a reference to national mourning. The cyclamens, Zalmona states, "are sometimes humanized: their leaves remind one of bodily forms, sexual organs, and buttocks, in celebratory or medical postures, sometimes withered, sometimes lushly blooming – a reference to the conditions of the human soul."

In addition to his expressive works, Gershuni began work on a large number of prints which he created at the Jerusalem Print Workshop. Among his works in this medium that stand out are the series of etchings called "Kaddish" (1984), each of which includes words from the Jewish prayer of mourning Kaddish, a series of prints from the poems of Hayim Nahman Bialik (1986), etc.

In 1986 a large exhibition of Gershuni's paintings, curated by Zalmona, was held in the Israel Museum. The exhibition - entitled "For Man and Beast are Creatures of Chance" - displayed the major series of Gershuni's works from the time he moved into the medium of painting. Itamar Levy provided an iconographic interpretation of Gershuni's work and connected his images to artistic works from the history of western art. The meeting between these and Gershuni "the Jew" creates a space in which the old world order has awakened and "the aspiration toward the lofty is written in bodily fluids and systems of limbs." In his article Zalmona also mentioned the erotic aspect of Gershuni's work and presented it as a sign of his search for self-identity.

The exhibition "Through a Glass Darkly," (1986) mounted for the first time at the Israel Museum, also exhibited Gershuni's aspirations toward the lofty. In addition to the text, the drawings display eschatological elements which were characteristic of Gershuni during this period, such as pentagrams, question marks, etc. An interesting iconographic element that appears in some of the paintings is the number "8." The use of this figure, which appeared earlier in the paintings of Arie Aroch as a symbol for infinity, appears in Gershuni's paintings as a symbol for aspiration toward the lofty and divine love, within a chaotic and "earthly" framework.

At the end of the 1980s Gershuni began once again to create works that used old porcelain ware. Works such as "Here I Am!!!," "Justice Shall Walk Before Him," or "Where Are All the Jews?" all of them from 1988, included textual imagery drawn from Jewish sources. Gershuni juxtaposed them to graphic images such as stars or Magen Davids (Stars of David), swastikas, and fingerprints.

=== Kaddish, 1989–99 ===
==== Wreaths ====
In 1990 a large solo exhibition of Gershuni's works, entitled "Works, 1987-1990" and curated by Itamar Levy, was held at the Tel Aviv Museum of Art. The exhibition presented new images that had been added to Gershuni's iconography, among them, wreaths of flowers. The wreaths, which in Western culture are perceived as symbols of victory and of mourning, appeared in Gershuni's works as self-contained images floating in empty space. Alongside wreaths with abundant petals were also wreaths that were nearly bare. "The wreath project gradually wilted and dropped off," Gershuni testified, "the glory faded, the wreaths became bare." In one of my last I wrote "Come, my bride," but not in the usual sense, but rather in the sense of wilting, annihilation, end."

The wreaths appeared again as a motif in the artist's book Kaddish (1997), which was accompanied by the text of Allen Ginsberg's poem "Kaddish" (1961). The book included 24 pages, 54 x 76 centimeters in size, on which Ginsberg's text in English was printed, with a translation into Hebrew by Nathan Zach, and with prints on gold leaf. The book was displayed in 1999 in the Jewish Center in the New Synagogue, Berlin, and in 2000 in the Tel Aviv Museum of Art, in exhibition cases that looked like the benches in a synagogue.

On November 26, 1998, in a gallery used for artists workshops in Tel Aviv, a joint exhibition of works by Gershuni and the photographer Shosh Kormosh. In the works he displayed in this exhibition Gershuni returned to the motif of wreaths, but this time he created them using a technique of obliterating the color from the surface of the painting by scratching it off with his fingernails.

==== Eyes ====
In May 1996 Gershuni held a joint exhibition with Raffi Lavie in the Givon Gallery in Tel Aviv. The exhibition was considered one of the most important exhibitions of its time, not only because it presented a body of works of two canonical figures in Israeli art, or as it was defined, of "local masters turning 60," but primarily because of its relationship to Israeli public space.

Gershuni's works, which included captions such as "El Male Rachamim" [God, Full of Mercy], from the "Kaddish" prayer, included images in large, dark paint stains, similar to eyes, making use of the thick impasto. The combination of these paintings with the paintings of Lavie, who for the first time used red paint stains and "shots" of color in his works, were interpreted as a direct reaction to the assassination of Yitzhak Rabin, even though Gershuni's works were painted before the murder. Another indication of Gershuni's personal involvement in Rabin's murder and its implications can be seen in Aharon Shabtai's article "Moishe" (2010), in which he sets forth his political views at the time and describes his growing closeness to Leah Rabin. In addition to this Gershuni displayed works in a group exhibition called "After Rabin: New Works in Israeli Art" in 1998 at the Jewish Museum in New York City.

The "eyes" motif that appears in Gershuni's works and creates a kind of basic facial form possesses a rich iconography. Along with literary references such as Hayyim Nahman Bialik's poem, "These hungry eyes that so earnestly seek," or the poetry of Avraham Ben-Yitzhak, Gershuni testified that the eyes came from "there." "Sometimes I think of the picture of my family from Poland...as the source of those eyes. I also have in my head a picture of a moving train, and from between the slats a pair of dark eyes of a little girl or little boy peeps out. The empty eyes followed me around long before I painted them, following an exhibition of Roman busts in the Louisiana Museum years ago...it was specifically the holes, the lack of eyes, that created an opening to the black emptiness within the sculpture, that pointed out that the sculpted, molded face was a thin, empty shell.

In Ziva Postec's film, "Hakhanot Lepreda" (Preparation for Parting) (1997: 88 minutes), documenting Gershuni's conduct during this period, Gershuni points out the connection between his personal biography and his faith. In 1997 Gershuni suffered an anxiety attack and was hospitalized in the "Geha" Mental Health Center. During his hospitalization Gershuni created an entire series of drawings he called "Ein Harod," in which he refers to the etymology of the word "haredah" (anxiety). The drawings continued Gershuni's preoccupation with a kind of abstraction of the round form. In an interview just before the drawings went on display in a 2003 exhibition in the Museum of Art (Mishkan LeOmanut) Ein Harod named after Chaim Atar, Gershuni explained the title of the drawings and their significance: " I called the exhibition 'Ein Harod.' This seems to me artistically appropriate because these drawings of the landscape, comprised of a line signifying the horizon with a circle above it, are very abstract, and this name gives them concreteness and place. Ein Harod is the eye of the fear, the eye of the storm. It seems to me that this series was created from within the greatest loneliness, or the loneliest journey, that I have ever made."

This works in this series join the large group of paintings Gershuni produced from the middle of the 1990s, and they are materially minimalistic, in a way that stands out from Gershuni's previous work. The drawings, which are saturated with an atmosphere of transcendentalism, are done on canvas that Gershuni treats with different drawing materials in order to bring out the physical structure of the canvas.

In 1999 Gershuni and the photographer Zohar Kaniel, his partner from 1997 until 2000, mounted an exhibit of photographs in the framework of the "Art Focus 3" exhibition. The photographs included intimate scenes of the couple in their bathroom, reflected in the mirror. The exhibition was called "Phaedrus," from Plato's dialogue "Phaedrus," which discusses the significance of love and the soul. Kaniel's works emphasized the reflexive dimension of the act of observation by the pair of lovers.

Parallel with this, Gershuni was invited to curate an exhibition at the Israel Museum, composed of works from the museum's collections. This exhibition also included photographs from the series that Kaniel had created. After he curated the exhibition at the Israel Museum, entitled "Artist's Slant – Moshe Gershuni Selects from the Museum's Collection," the museum's curators tried to cancel the exhibition because of the provocative nature of the photographs. They also claimed that Gershuni made only minimal use of the museum's collections, When the museum failed to cancel Gershuni's exhibition because of an injunction Gershuni brought against it, a sign was hung at the entrance to the exhibition saying that "The exhibition includes a personal statement by the artist and does not express the Museum's position." A detailed description of the incident appears in Studio magazine, which was the most influential art magazine in Israel at that time.

=== 2000s ===
In 2000 Gershuni became romantically involved with Juan Jose Garcia Pineiro, a young Spanish man he had met on the Internet in 1999. Pineiro immigrated to Israel and began living with Gershuni in Tel Aviv. In addition, Gershuni rented a new, large studio in Southern Tel Aviv.

During the first half of the decade, a number of exhibitions that recycled earlier works of Gershuni were held. In Hamidrisha Gallery the installation "A Gentle Hand" was set up again and then left there as a permanent exhibition, and in 2005 the exhibition "Little Red Works," which had originally been mounted in the Sarah Levi Gallery in Tel Aviv in 1979, was set up again. It was curated by Benno Kalev, a collector who bought many of the works that appeared in this exhibition.

After the decision was published by the Israeli Ministry of Education, Gershuni announced that he refused to shake the hand of Prime Minister Ariel Sharon or Minister of Education Limor Livnat, and that he did not intend to take part in the Israel Prize awards ceremony. "I am very happy to receive the Israel Prize," Gershuni announced, "but I am very sad to receive it in the political and social conditions that exist in Israel today." In a letter that he sent to the Ministry of Culture on April 4, Gershuni wrote, "I cannot come and take part in the ceremony awarding the prizes. This is not the time for ceremonies and parties." At the same time as the storm in the press was going on, Gershuni petitioned the High Court to allow him to accept the Israel Prize without being required to attend the awards ceremony, but the High Court rejected his petition and made receiving the prize conditional on participation in the awards ceremony. In a later interview Gershuni referred to this incident and claimed that his refusal to participate in the ceremony was a result of his artistic reaction. "I had no choice," Gershuni said, "I once did a work against Arik Sharon; how can I make a mockery of my art and shake his hand now? My art is more important to me than my life. It was a symbolic refusal, an expression of opposition to all the policies of this country."

On March 27, 2006, at Bet Gabriel on the Sea of Galilee, the exhibition "Sham-Mayim," curated by Gideon Ofrat, opened. In this exhibition Gershuni returned to the image of wreaths. He used watercolors and acrylic paint in shades of blue. In some of the paintings the expression "Field of Sacred Apples," a kabbalistic expression from the liturgical poem by Isaac Luria, "Azmir le-Shabahim" (I Sing Psalms in Honor of Shabbat), chanted at the Friday night meal, appears. Ofrat described the use of the old motif of the wreaths not only as a symbol of victory and of mourning, but also as an expression of sexuality, of the desire to mate, and of Eros, all of which symbolize the attempt to reach transcendental union.

On June 24, 2006, an exhibition opened at the Givon Art Gallery in which Gershuni displayed a series of paintings on fabric, done in the technique of Impasto [paint applied thickly] using oil paints and thickening gel, with a spray dripping water on the damp gel layer. These paintings, which he had begun to create at the beginning of the decade, had the look of "fields of paint," in the style of the "New York School." The works strove, in Gershuni's words, to be "a transparent screen of shadows that come from the black place." In this way Gershuni sought to make the viewer look at and thus become aware of how a painting creates an artistic illusion. In the exhibition that he mounted at the Givon Art Gallery, Gershuni even directed groups of lights on the paintings in a way that created different focuses of light on the surfaces of the paintings. A similar exhibition," "Whoever Sheds the Blood of Man in Man his Blood be Shed," [An Eye for an Eye] from Pirkei Avot, took place in March 2008 in the Kfar Saba Municipal Art Gallery. At the same time Gershuni began to create a series of medium-sized bronze sculptures. These sculptures were produced using bronze casting methods from different sculptures, probably figurative, made by amateur sculptors.

In 2002 Gershuni was diagnosed with Parkinson's disease. In spite of the effects of the disease, Gershuni continued with his artistic output. A series of works that aroused great interest in the press in this regard was a group of drawings called "Summer 2009" that was displayed in 2009 in the Givon Art Gallery. The exhibition displayed a large series of papers, both small and medium in size, with images of light blue patches of color. A group of these drawings was later exhibited at the Museum of Art, Ein Harod, within the framework of the Collection of Gaby and Ami Brown.

=== 2010s ===
In November 2010, a retrospective exhibition of Gershuni's works opened at the Tel Aviv Museum of Art, curated by Sarah Breitberg-Semel. Another exhibition of his works from the 1980s onward opened in November 2014 at the Neue Nationalgalerie in Berlin, Germany.

Gershuni died on 22 January 2017 in Tel Aviv at the age of 80.

== Trends in the work of Moshe Gershuni ==
Gershuni's varied work has had a great deal of influence on Israeli art. The combination of biographical characteristics, homosexual sexual expression, and aggressive expressionism, have comprised his most noticeable examples of anti-modernism beginning in the 1970s. In the 1970s Gershuni created minimalist art, in touch with American influences. However his work, along with the strictly formal side, was concerned with the physical aspect of artistic materials. In his work of these years there is a feeling of his squeezing in under the modernist grid while emphasizing self-examination and physical examination at the same time that he is adapting new artistic techniques, such as installation art, performance art, and environmental works. "A great many of my works in the 1970s were connected to what was going on between us and Europe," Gershuni noted with regard to his work from these years, "which was essentially our homeland, because we did not have a history of art of our own in Israel,...while on the other hand there is the Zionist thing...we want to be part of the East, not part of the decadence of Europe."

In her article, ""The Want of Matter: A Quality in Israeli Art" (1986), Sarah Breitberg-Semel described Gershuni's work as conducting a complex, "two-faced" dialogue with Europe and its culture. On one hand this work is saturated with the characteristics of the same culture with which, on the other hand, he conducts a blood feud in the name of the Jewish people."

In his article "The Visibility and Invisibility of Trauma" (1996), Roee Rosen claims that Gershuni's works during the 1980s express a paradoxical relationship to the trauma of the Holocaust. The works are full of a mixture of symbols of European culture and of Jewish culture together with symbols of sexual transgression. This mixture, Rosen says, delays the establishment of a homogeneous, hermetic identity, and allows a reflexive view of the trauma of the Holocaust.

== Awards and recognition ==
- 1969 Aika Brown Prize, Israel Museum
- 1982 Sandberg Prize for an Israeli Artist, Israel Museum
- 1988 Minister of Education and Culture Prize for a Young Artist,
- 1989 Kolb Prize, Tel Aviv Museum
- 1994 Sussman Prize, Yad Vashem
- 1995 Mendel and Eva Pondik Prize, Tel Aviv Museum
- 2000 George and Janet Jaffin Prize Since America-Israel Cultural Foundation
- 2003 Israel Prize was cancelled as he refused to participate at the awards ceremony
- 2003 Honor Member of the LGBT community for his contribution to culture.
- 2006 Yakir Bezalel Jerusalem

== See also ==
- Visual arts in Israel
