= Printer =

Printer may refer to:

== Technology ==
- Printer (publishing), a person
- Printer (computing), a hardware device
- Optical printer for motion picture films

== People ==
- Nariman Printer (fl. c. 1940), Indian journalist and activist
- James Printer (1640–1709), Native American from the Nipmuc tribe who worked as a printer in Cambridge, Massachusetts, U.S.
- Casey Printers (born 1981), U.S. football player

== Places ==
- Printer, Kentucky, an unincorporated community and coal town in Floyd County, Kentucky, U.S.
- Printer's Alley, an alley in downtown Nashville, Tennessee, U.S., that was historically home to multiple publishers
- Printer's Park, a small park in the Bronx, New York City, U.S.

== See also ==
- Print (disambiguation)
- The Moscow subway station Pechatniki, whose name means "Printers"
