= Graphic Exchange Magazine =

Publication on graphic arts and communication for creative professionals

Graphic Exchange (gX) was a print publication for creative professionals in graphic communications and graphic arts with an editorial focus on creative imaging, graphic design, prepress, digital video and Web publishing. It was conceived and launched by Dan Brill and Diane Boadway in October, 1991 and was based in Toronto, Ontario, Canada.

== History ==
During its first five years of publication, Graphic Exchange broke many of the barriers in publishing through the use of new desktop technologies and printing techniques, including experimentation with and coverage of stochastic screening, waterless printing, CD-ROM publishing, and digital video, as well as various new software and hardware products introduced during that period.

In 1995, Graphic Exchange added Web publishing to its editorial mandate. By 1998, Graphic Exchange had become the highest circulation graphics publication in Canada with a circulation of over 18,000. In October, 2001, the magazine published its biggest issue in concert with its tenth anniversary. Major advertisers included such household names as Apple Computer, Adobe Systems, Xerox, Corel, Agfa, Heidelberg, Radius, Viewsonic and Mitsubishi.

In 2004, with many of its advertisers having migrated to direct marketing and email campaigns, the publication changed from conventional magazine size to a large landscape format, and its publication schedule moved from bi-monthly to semi-annually. It was also published simultaneously in rich PDF (Portable Document Format that included links, video, music, and other rich media), the first publication in the world to use this new format. In 2006, gX began broadening its content to reflect an updated editorial mandate that encompassed themes related to the intersection of art and design with technology. Editorial reflected such topics as the use of wide screens in architecture and digital music.

Print production was halted in 2006 Graphic Exchange continued to post online at gXo.com until 2011.
