= Fingerprint (disambiguation) =

A fingerprint is a mark made by the pattern of ridges on the pad of a human finger.

Fingerprint may also reference to:

== Science and technology ==
- Genetic fingerprint, distinguishing two individuals of the same species using only samples of their DNA
- Peptide mass fingerprinting, in biochemistry, identification of proteins
- Fingerprint (computing), uniquely identifying data by extracting from it a small key known as a fingerprint
  - Public key fingerprint, a string of bytes identifying a cryptographic public key
  - Acoustic fingerprint, in audio technology, unique code generated from audio samples, allowing computer identification of music
  - Digital video fingerprinting, generates unique codes from digital video samples, and is used for automated copyright enforcement
  - TCP/IP stack fingerprinting, identifying computer operating systems from network packets
  - Device fingerprint, harvesting of software and hardware settings from a remote computing device
  - Canvas fingerprinting, a browser fingerprinting technique for tracking users
  - Rabin fingerprint
- Ballistic fingerprinting, a set of forensic techniques that to match a bullet to the gun it was fired with
- Radio fingerprinting, characteristic signature from minute variations of frequencies emitted by a radio frequency device
- Isotopic fingerprint, characteristic ratios of isotopes in material
- Fingerprint, in the forensic identification of a typewriter
- Fingerprint, in the forensic identification of a paper shredder

== Arts and entertainment ==
=== Literature ===
- Fingerprints (comics), the Southland Tales graphic novel
- Finger Prints (book), a book published by Francis Galton in 1892

=== Films ===
- Finger Prints (film), a lost 1927 silent film directed by Lloyd Bacon
- Finger Prints (serial), a lost 1931 Universal serial directed by Ray Taylor
- Fingerprints (film), 2006

=== Albums ===
- Fingerprint (album), by Mark Heard
- Fingerprints (Peter Frampton album), 2006
- Fingerprints (Amelia Lily album)
- Fingerprints (Eli Young Band album), 2017

=== Songs ===
- "Fingerprint", a song by Leona Lewis from her 2012 album Glassheart
- "Fingerprints", a song by The Black Heart Procession from their 2002 album Amore del Tropico
- "Fingerprints", a series of songs by They Might Be Giants from their 1992 album Apollo 18
- "Fingerprints", a song by Katy Perry from her 2008 album One of the Boys
- "Fingerprints", a song by Chick Corea from his 2013 album Trilogy
- "Fingerprints", a song by Minipop from their 2007 album A New Hope

== See also ==
- Glove prints, a mark made by the pattern of a glove that is worn over the human hand
- Dermatoglyphics, the scientific study of fingerprints
- Multiple Intelligences
- The Myth of Fingerprints, a 1997 film starring Julianne Moore
- Fingerprints of the Gods, a 1995 alternative science text
- Fingerprints: The Best of Powderfinger, 1994–2000, Powderfinger's 'best-of' compilation
- Fingerprint Records, record label and recording studio owned by Mark Heard
