= Finger Prints (book) =

1892 book by Francis Galton

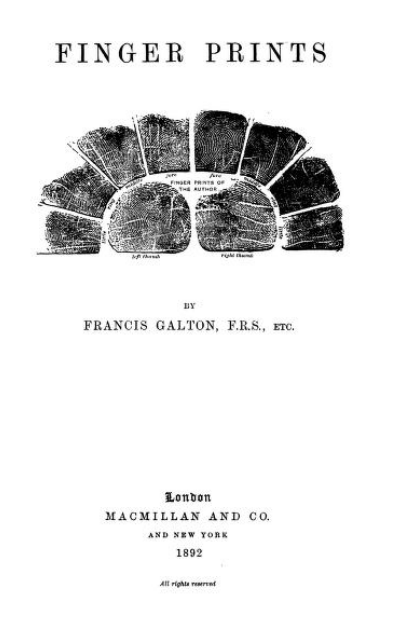
- Title page for Finger Prints (1892)
- Author: Francis Galton
- Genre: Science
- Publisher: Macmillan
- Publication date: 1892

Finger Prints is a book published by Francis Galton through Macmillan in 1892. It was one of the first books to provide a scientific footing for matching fingerprints and for later acceptance in courts. He collected information from a number of people and recorded their backgrounds, financial situations, likes and dislikes, health, etc. on a large scale. By that time, it was known that the fingerprints of different people were different. He collected fingerprints of a large number of people and invented a method of their classification. Using statistical methods he showed that the possibility of fingerprints of two different people being identical is nearly zero. This result made it possible to identify a person from his fingerprints. This method of identifying criminals was accepted in the judiciary.
