= Print shop =

Print shop may refer to:

- Printer (publishing), someone providing commercial printing services
- The Print Shop desktop publishing software
