= Walter Sneyd =

English politician

Member of Parliament for Castle Rising
- In office 1784–1790 Serving with Charles Boone
- Preceded by: Robert Mackreth
- Succeeded by: Henry Drummond

Personal details
- Born: 11 February 1752
- Died: 23 June 1829 (aged 77)
- Spouse: Hon. Louisa Bagot (m. 1786)
- Relations: Sir Walter Bagot, 5th Baronet (grandfather); Ralph Sneyd (grandfather)
- Parent(s): Barbara Bagot; Ralph Sneyd
- Education: Brasenose College, Oxford

Lieutenant-Colonel Walter Sneyd (11 February 1752 – 23 June 1829), of Keele Hall was an English politician who served in the Parliament of Great Britain and as High Sheriff of Staffordshire.

== Early life ==
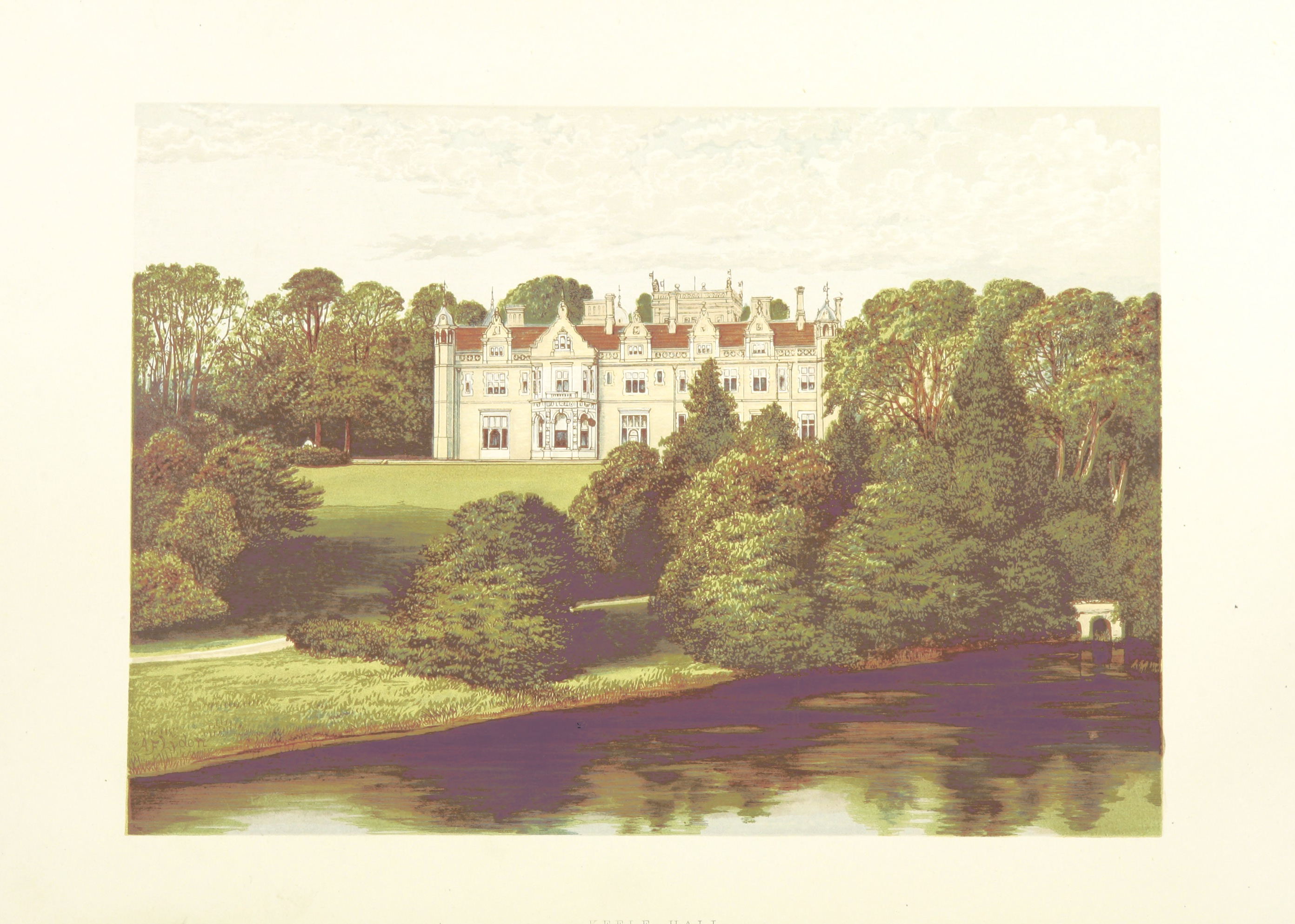
Keele Hall, 1879

Sneyd was born on 11 February 1752 in an old Staffordshire parliamentary family. He was a son of the former Barbara Bagot and Ralph Sneyd of Keele Hall, Staffordshire. His younger brother, the Rev. Ralph Sneyd married Penelope Moore (a daughter of the Hon. Sir John Moore and granddaughter of Henry, Earl of Drogheda)

His paternal grandfather was Ralph Sneyd, MP for Staffordshire. His maternal grandfather was Sir Walter Bagot, 5th Baronet and Lady Barbara Legge (daughter of William Legge, 1st Earl of Dartmouth).

He was educated at Brasenose College, Oxford, 1769.

== Career ==
He was admitted to Middle Temple in 1771 and held a commission in the Staffordshire Militia, eventually rising to the rank of Lieutenant-Colonel and being appointed Lt-Col Commandant of the Northern Regiment, Staffordshire Local Militia on 1 March 1809.

He was a Member of the Parliament of Great Britain for Castle Rising beginning in 1784. His return was arranged by his uncle Richard Bagot (1733–1813), whose wife, Frances Howard (a daughter of William Howard, Viscount Andover and granddaughter of Henry Howard, 11th Earl of Suffolk, who controlled one seat in the borough). Sneyd voted with the Opposition on Pitt’s Irish propositions, 13 May 1785, but with Administration on the Regency, 1788-9. He is not known to have spoken in the House, nor did he stand again in 1790.

Upon his father's death on 10 February 1793, he succeeded to Keele Hall. From 1813 to 1814, he was the High Sheriff of Staffordshire.

== Personal life ==
On 9 May 1786, Sneyd was married to his cousin, the Hon. Louisa Bagot (1764–1834), a daughter of William Bagot, 1st Baron Bagot and the former Elizabeth St John (the eldest daughter of John St John, 2nd Viscount St John and sister of Frederick St John, 2nd Viscount Bolingbroke and Gen. Henry St John). Together, they were the parents of two sons and six daughters, including:

- Ralph Sneyd (1793–1870), who died unmarried.
- Harriet Sneyd (1796–1867), an artist.
- Frances Sneyd (1798–1884), who married William Arundell Bouverie, the Archdeacon of Norfolk who was a son of Bartholomew Bouverie and grandson of William Bouverie, 1st Earl of Radnor, in 1831. Frances was maid of honour to Queen Adelaide.
- Charlotte Augusta Sneyd (1800–1882), also an artist.
- Elizabeth Sneyd (1806–1869)
- Rev. Walter Sneyd (1809–1888), a bibliophile and antiquarian. He married his cousin, Henrietta Elizabeth Sneyd (1829–1913), a daughter of Richard Malone Sneyd of Cherryvale.

He died 23 June 1829. His widow died in 1834.

=== Legacy ===
His eldest son Ralph inherited Keele Hall and rebuilt it, as it is today, to the design of Anthony Salvin at a cost of about 80,000 pounds. On his death, the estate passed to his younger brother Walter. His son, Ralph Sneyd (1863–1949), took little interest in the Sneyd estate since his appointment as a Colonel of the Staffordshire Yeomanry during World War I. He died childless in 1949, and his successor, Maj. Henry Ralph Mowbray Howard-Sneyd (Note: Maj. Henry Ralph Mowbray Howard-Sneyd (1883–1950) had married Helen Millicent James, a sister of Audrey and Edward James, children of American merchant William Dodge James (son of Daniel James and brother of Frank Linsly James and John Arthur James) and the British aristocrat Evelyn Elizabeth Forbes (a daughter of the 4th Baronet of Newe). The James' were frequent hosts to Edward, Prince of Wales at their estate, West Dean House. Maj. Howard's son, Thomas Henry Gavin Howard-Sneyd was married to Serena Patience Lumley.) (the son of Ralph's elder sister Louisa Georgina (née Sneyd) Howard and Robert Mowbray Howard MP, a son of Henry Howard of Greystoke Castle) died the following year, which reduced the family fortune by three quarters due to the doubling of death duties going to the Exchequer. The remaining, unsold, parts of the estate were broken up by his heirs.
