= Daniel Willis James =

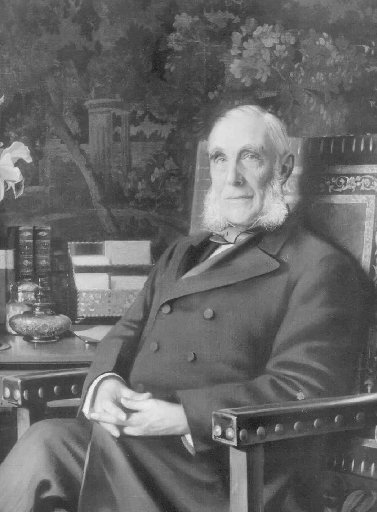
- Born: April 15, 1832; Liverpool, England
- Died: September 13, 1907 (aged 75); Bretton Woods, New Hampshire, U.S.
- Resting place: Green-Wood Cemetery
- Education: Amherst College
- Spouse: Ellen S. Curtiss
- Children: Arthur Curtiss James
- Parent(s): Daniel James; Elizabeth Woodbridge Phelps
- Relatives: Sisters: Elizabeth & Olivia. Brothers: Henry & Anson. Paternal half brothers: Frank Linsly James; John Arthur James; William Dodge James.

Daniel Willis James (April 15, 1832 – September 13, 1907) was the son of an American merchant who with his cousin, William Earl Dodge Jr., transformed Phelps, Dodge & Co. from a predominantly mercantile business into one of the largest copper producers in the world.

== Biography ==
James was born in Liverpool, England, the son of American merchant, Daniel James, who was domiciled in England. His mother, Elizabeth Woodbridge (Phelps), died in 1847 and two years later his father remarried. In that same year James moved to New York to further his education and work in the family business of Phelps, Dodge. The company was run by Anson Greene Phelps and three of his sons-in-law: In New York William Earl Dodge Sr. and James Stokes, and in the UK Daniel James. The primary trade was importing metals to America and exporting cotton to the UK. They had subsidiary interests in lumber, property, railroad and manufacturing. By the time Phelps died in 1853 James had a 5% share in the business. As the years progressed, this increased until he and his cousin, William E. Dodge Jr., were the sole partners.

In 1880 the president of the Detroit Copper Mining Company at Morenci, William Church, asked Phelps, Dodge for financial assistance. The partners appointed Dr James Douglas to inspect the mines and give his opinion on the viability. He reported back that Morenci had potential and was even more enthusiastic about the Bisbee area. The partners asked Douglas to work for them and gave him the choice of a flat fee or a 10% interest in the mining operation; Douglas took the latter. Despite early setbacks the mines eventually became highly productive and highly profitable.

Transportation to and from the mines was a problem so the partners built their own railroad called the El Paso and Southwestern Railroad. They next purchased the El Paso and Northeastern Railroad to secure delivery from their coal mines in Dawson, New Mexico to their smelting plants. Eventually they had more than 1000 miles of track.

By 1906, Phelps, Dodge & Co. had wound up their old mercantile business to concentrate on the production of copper and copper wire.

James served on the board of other large U.S. corporations, including the Northern Pacific Railroad Company, the Arizona, El Paso and Southwestern Mining Company, and the Ansonia Clock Company. He also served as vice president and director of the Copper Queen Consolidated Mining Company in Bisbee, Arizona.

According to one historian, James was "a genuinely good man of impeccable character, a secret philanthropist, whom Charles Parkhurst said loved everything in the universe 'from God down to the newsboy.'" He donated the Union Square Drinking Fountain in New York. In 1885, his family built a summer home in Madison, New Jersey, and James there built a park and a free library, believing the latter would be "a means of public enjoyment and benefit."

James married Ellen S. Curtiss, with whom he had a son, Arthur Curtiss James. James died at the Mount Washington Hotel, Bretton Woods, New Hampshire, in September 1907, one of the hundred wealthiest Americans, having left a large fortune estimated at $26 million (U.S. dollars). Included were bequests to charities and religious institutions of $1,195,000. The library James built in Madison, New Jersey, is the home of the Museum of Early Trades and Crafts.

Williston, North Dakota, was named for him by his friend, railroad magnate James J. Hill.

Family of Daniel Willis James

Elizabeth Woodbridge Phelps (1807-1847)	Daniel James (1801-1876)	Sophia Hall Hitchcock (1820-1870)
Anson Greene Phelps James (1830-1842)	Daniel Willis James (1832-1907) m.1854 Ellen Stebbins Curtiss (1833-1916)	Elizabeth Eggleston James (1833-1868)	Olivia James (1837-1935) m.1863 Robert Hoe III (1839-1909)	Henry James (1839-1839)	Frank Linsly James (1851-1890)	John Arthur James (1853-1917) m.1885 Mary Venetia Cavendish-Bentinick (1861-1948)	William Dodge James (1854-1912) m.1889 Evelyn Elizabeth Forbes (1867-1927)
Arthur Curtiss James (1867-1941) m.1890 Harriet Eddy Parsons (1868-1941)
