= William Dodge James =

American-English big game hunter (1854–1912)

- Born: 7 December 1854
- Died: 22 March 1912 (aged 57)
- Spouse: Evelyn Elizabeth Forbes
- Children: 5, including Edward James
- Parent(s): Daniel James; Sofia Hall Hitchcock

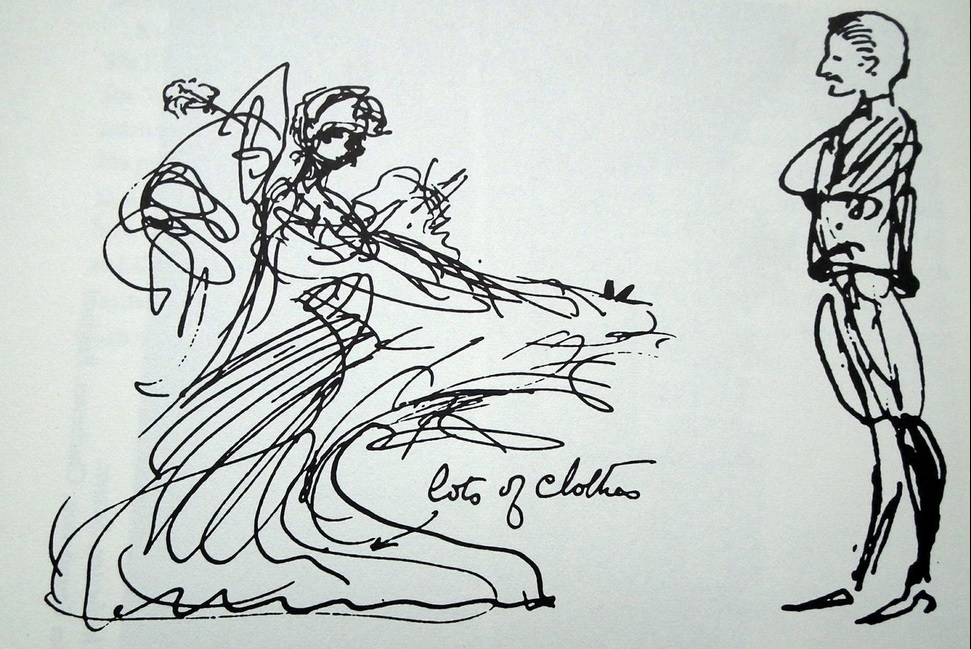
Mr & Mrs Willie James by Edwin Lutyens

William Dodge James, CVO DL (December 7, 1854 – March 22, 1912) was the son of a wealthy American merchant, who was raised and educated in England. He married Evelyn Elizabeth Forbes, daughter of the 4th Baronet of Newe, who became a celebrated society hostess of the period. James was a big game hunter and Albert Edward, Prince of Wales, was one of the frequent visitors to their West Dean country estate in West Sussex.

== Early life ==
William's father, Daniel, was the son of a Connecticut farmer who when young had walked barefoot to New York to save wear on his shoes. He married the daughter of merchant Anson Greene Phelps and ran the British end of his organisation, exporting metal to America and importing cotton in return. He remained in Liverpool for the rest of his life, becoming a highly respected merchant in Anglo-American trade. His American partners diversified into lumber, property, and rail roads. When Daniel died in 1876 he was a shareholder in his brother Henry's lumber business in Baltimore, and he held an 18% share of the Phelps, Dodge & Co., business, considered to be the largest mercantile house in the world dealing in metals. His eldest son from his first marriage, Daniel Willis James, also held 18%.

Following the death of his first wife in 1847, Daniel James remarried to American, Sofia Hall Hitchcock. They had 3 children, Frank Linsly, John Arthur, and William, who was the youngest. After Daniel's death, the three sons received the interest from $100,000 invested for each of them by their American Trustees (Daniel Willis James and Henry James) until William reached the age of 25. At this point they became entitled to the principles sums and investments of their father's estate.

== Exploration and big game hunting ==
William, educated at Harrow, suffered ill-health as a teenager and as a consequence spent several winters in the warm climate of Egypt with his elder brother, Frank, who had graduated from Downing College. The brothers become interested in exploration and in 1877, they undertook a desert crossing from the Nile to the borders of Abyssinia. The following year they travelled to India and accompanied troops through the Khyber Pass. In 1880–81 they explored areas of Sudan in preparation for a more extensive expedition and hunting trip the following year. During 1882–83 season, William accompanied his brother to Mexico, crossing overland to the Pacific side of the country. The brothers became members of the Royal Geographical Society (Frank was elected Fellow in 1881). William learnt map making techniques and during the 1884–85 season, he accompanied his brother on an expedition through Somalia, mapping areas hitherto unknown to Europeans. These were used to illustrate books published by Frank as were glass plate photographs taken by William.

In 1886, William and Frank used the steam yacht RYS Lancashire Witch, to cruise the Mediterranean. Later that year the brothers, with George Rous, 3rd Earl of Stradbroke, and Viscount Dungarvan, sailed to India and the Persian Gulf. In 1888, the brothers took the Lancashire Witch to the West Indies with Aldred Lumley, 10th Earl of Scarbrough and the Hon. W. Ponsonby. Later that same year they were off to Spitsbergen with Arctic explorer Sir Henry Gore-Booth, 5th Baronet.

== Death of Frank James ==
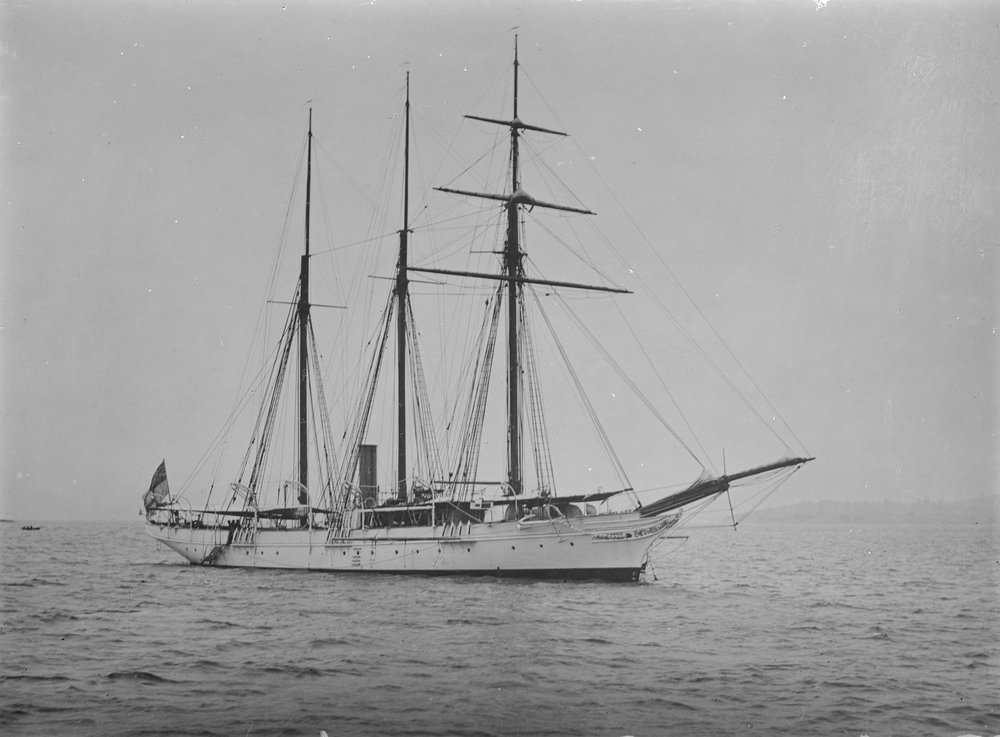
Lancashire Witch RYS, sold to Admiralty in 1893 and renamed HMS Waterwitch

In January 1890, Frank set sail on board the Lancashire Witch for Africa, this time without William, who had recently married. On 21 April, whilst on a hunting trip, Frank was killed by a wounded elephant. His body was recovered with difficulty and returned to England to be buried at Kensal Green Cemetery, London; later his remains were transferred to the family plot at West Dean, West Sussex.

The death of Frank came as a terrible blow to his brothers, but particularly to William, an experienced big game hunter, who had been his companion on almost all of his previous expeditions. As a memorial, he and Arthur funded the building of a hospital for mariners in the town of East Cowes, Isle of Wight, named the Frank James Hospital.

== Marriage and West Dean House ==
In 1889, William married the 21-year-old Evelyn Elizabeth Forbes at St Paul's Church, Knightsbridge. She was the eldest daughter of Helen Moncreiffe and Sir Charles Forbes, 4th Baronet of Newe, whose estate, Castle Newe, was in the vicinity of Balmoral, the Scottish residence of Queen Victoria and Prince Albert. The families were acquainted, and Edward, Prince of Wales, and Princess Alexandra were fond of Evelyn Forbes, presenting her with a diamond and sapphire brooch when she married. The reception after the wedding was hosted by Georgina Ward, Countess of Dudley, who was Evelyn's aunt.

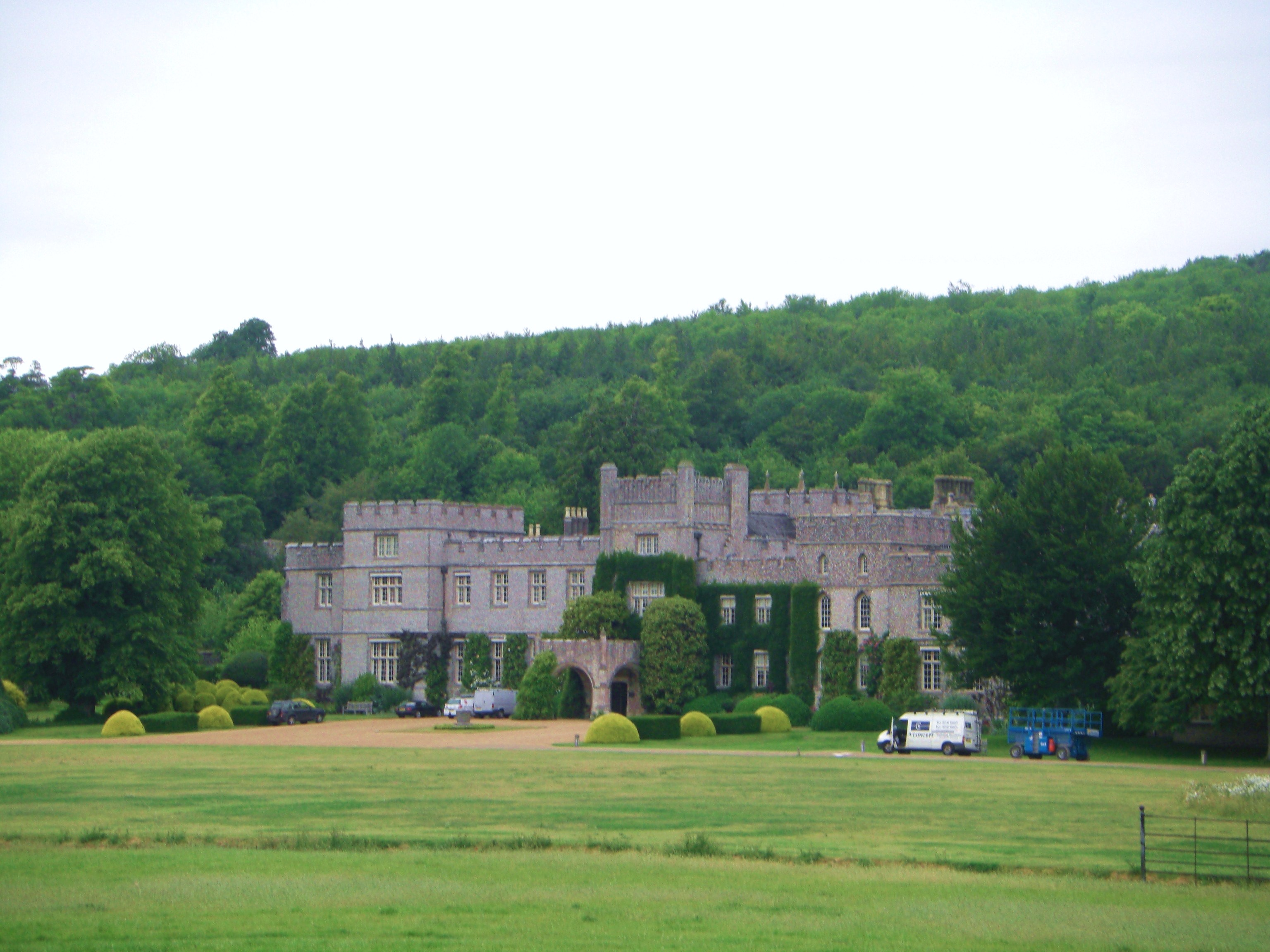
West Dean House

In 1891, William purchased the West Dean estate in the county of West Sussex from Frederick Bower, who coincidentally was a former cotton merchant from Liverpool who traded with China. William and Evelyn undertook extensive alterations to the West Dean House in preparations for house parties plus pheasant and partridge shoots. The location of a new railway station (opened in 1881) at Singleton, adjacent to the entrance to the estate, made it convenient for guests coming from London and was often used by the Prince of Wales.

After the death of his brother, William took over the ownership of the steam yacht Lancashire Witch and, in 1891, he was elected as a member of the Royal Yacht Squadron. He and Evelyn took several voyages, including one to the West Indies, where they became involved with the rescue of a shipwrecked crew of the barque Caribon. During an earlier cruise in 1888, William had also been involved with the rescue of the crews from three sealing vessels that had become icebound in the Kara Sea. In 1891, the yacht required extensive repair work at the yard of Day, Summers and Company in Southampton to replace timber planking. In 1893, William sold the yacht to the Admiralty for use as a survey ship on the Australia Station. She was renamed HMS Waterwitch, and after several years of service sunk in Singapore harbour in 1912.

In 1902, the Jameses built a house in the adjacent village of Chilgrove, as a retreat from West Dean, named Monkton House. It was designed by Edwin Lutyens, brick built and featuring loggia with deep balconies or sleeping porches. This unusual feature may have been influenced by William's experience of living in hot climates where this arrangement is more common. Lutyens had worked for the same firm of architects that had carried out the alteration work to West Dean House – Ernest George and Peto. In addition to Monkton and West Dean, the Jameses had a residence in Gullane, in East Lothian called Greywalls. This was another of Lutyen's designs with the garden influenced by Gertrude Jekyll. The Jameses London property was at 38 Bryanston Square, where William died on 22 March 1912.

Lutyens recorded his first impressions of William and Evelyn James when he visited them at West Dean in March 1902:

"Mr. James very neat, small: thin: young, turning towards, but gently, to middle age. Very quiet, reserved collected: an occasional spark of human feeling shewn by a twinkle: Improving on acquaintance and for a rich man – sitting on Hoheit's lap – delightful."

("Hoheit" was a reference to James's friendship with the King)

His first impressions of Evelyn were not so complimentary but he warmed to her.

== Public life ==
William took an active interest in community matters and gave generously of both time and money to charities and other good causes. An example in 1884 was his donation of land and funds for a village social club in Woolston where he had lived as a child. He was a Justice of the peace, the deputy lieutenant of West Sussex, served as the Sheriff of Sussex and was awarded the Commander of the Royal Victorian Order (CVO) by King Edward VII.

He was asked in 1904 what his hobbies were and said golf and shooting. He said he enjoyed motoring, owning a 12h.p. Panhard and 20h.p. Gobron-Brillié, and since becoming a motorist he estimated he had travelled 20,000 miles. He put down his clubs as the Turf Club and the Royal Yacht Squadron.

== Effigy of William James ==
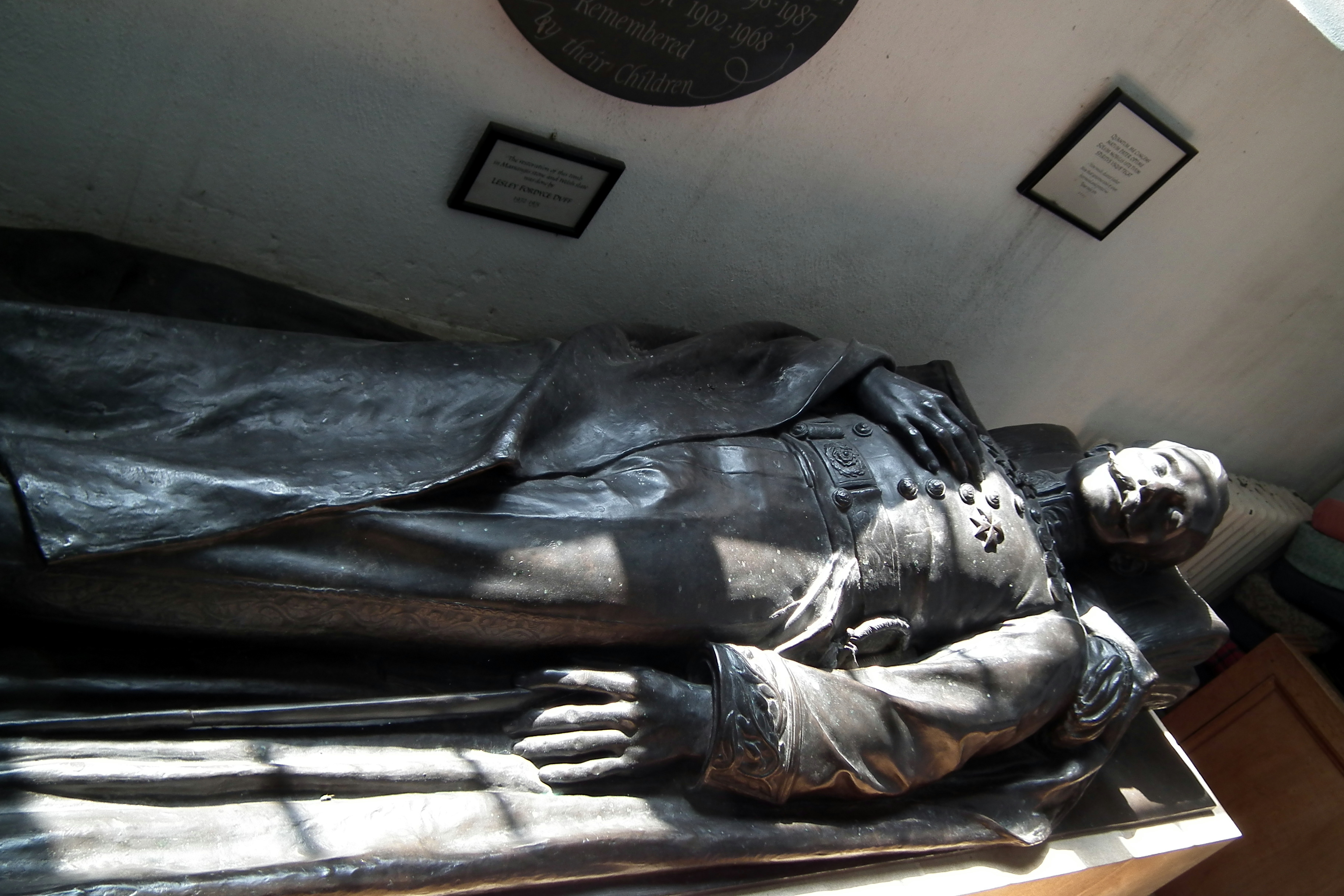
William Dodge James; St Andrew's Church, West Dean, West Sussex UK

The Effigy is in St Andrew's Church, West Dean, West Sussex. He is shown in a deputy lieutenant's uniform (rose badge on belt, oak lace cuffs). At his neck he has the CVO (Commander of the Victorian Order) with the Order of St John and Knight of St John on his left breast. The medals on his chest are the Queen Victoria Diamond Jubilee Medal, King Edward VII Coronation Medal and King George V Coronation Medal. At his feet is the Spanish Order of Isabella the Catholic. King Alfonso XIII of Spain was a guest at West Dean in November 1907. The bronze is by W. Goscombe John.

== Family ==
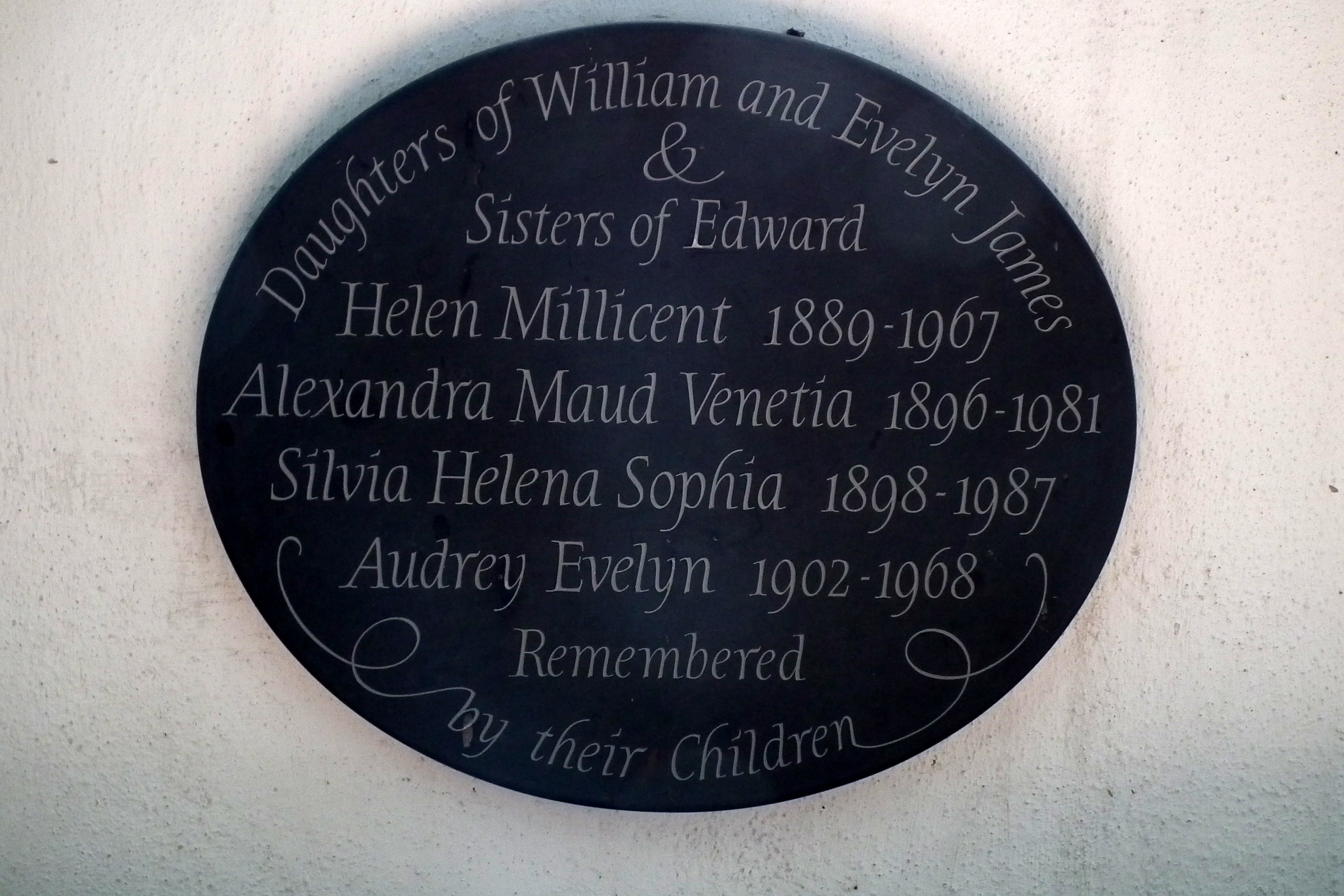
William and Evelyn's children. Plaque in St Andrew's West Dean, West Sussex UK

William died in March 1912 after becoming ill on a trip to South Africa. Evelyn, remarried in 1913 to Major John Chaytor Brinton, a member of the Royal Household; the marriage was annulled in 1927. She died in 1929 following a serious operation. William and Evelyn had five children, four girls and one boy named Edward William Frank James, whose godfather was King Edward VII. In 1964 Edward James turned the West Dean Estate over to an educational trust; he died in 1984.

William's mother Sofia had died in 1870 when he was 15. His brother, Arthur, died in 1917. His paternal half brother, Daniel Willis James, who had been born in Liverpool, died in America in 1907. William's paternal half sister, Olivia, married Robert Hoe III in 1868 and moved to America; she died in 1935 aged 98. His other half sister, Elizabeth Eccleston, had died in 1868.

William's daughter, Audrey Evelyn James Coats married Marshall Field III.

Family of William Dodge James

Elizabeth Woodbridge Phelps (1807–1847)				Daniel James (1801–1876)			Sophia Hall Hitchcock (1820–1870)
Anson Greene Phelps James (1830–1842)	Daniel Willis James (1832–1907) m.1854 Ellen Stebbins Curtiss (1833–1916)	Elizabeth Eggleston James (1833–1868)	Olivia James (1837–1935) m.1863 Robert Hoe III (1839–1909)	Henry James (1839–1839)	Frank Linsly James (1851–1890)	John Arthur James (1853–1917) m.1885 Mary Venetia Cavendish-Bentinick (1861–1948)	William Dodge James (1854–1912) m.1889 Evelyn Elizabeth Forbes (1867–1927)
