= West Dean House =

Listed manor house in West Sussex, England

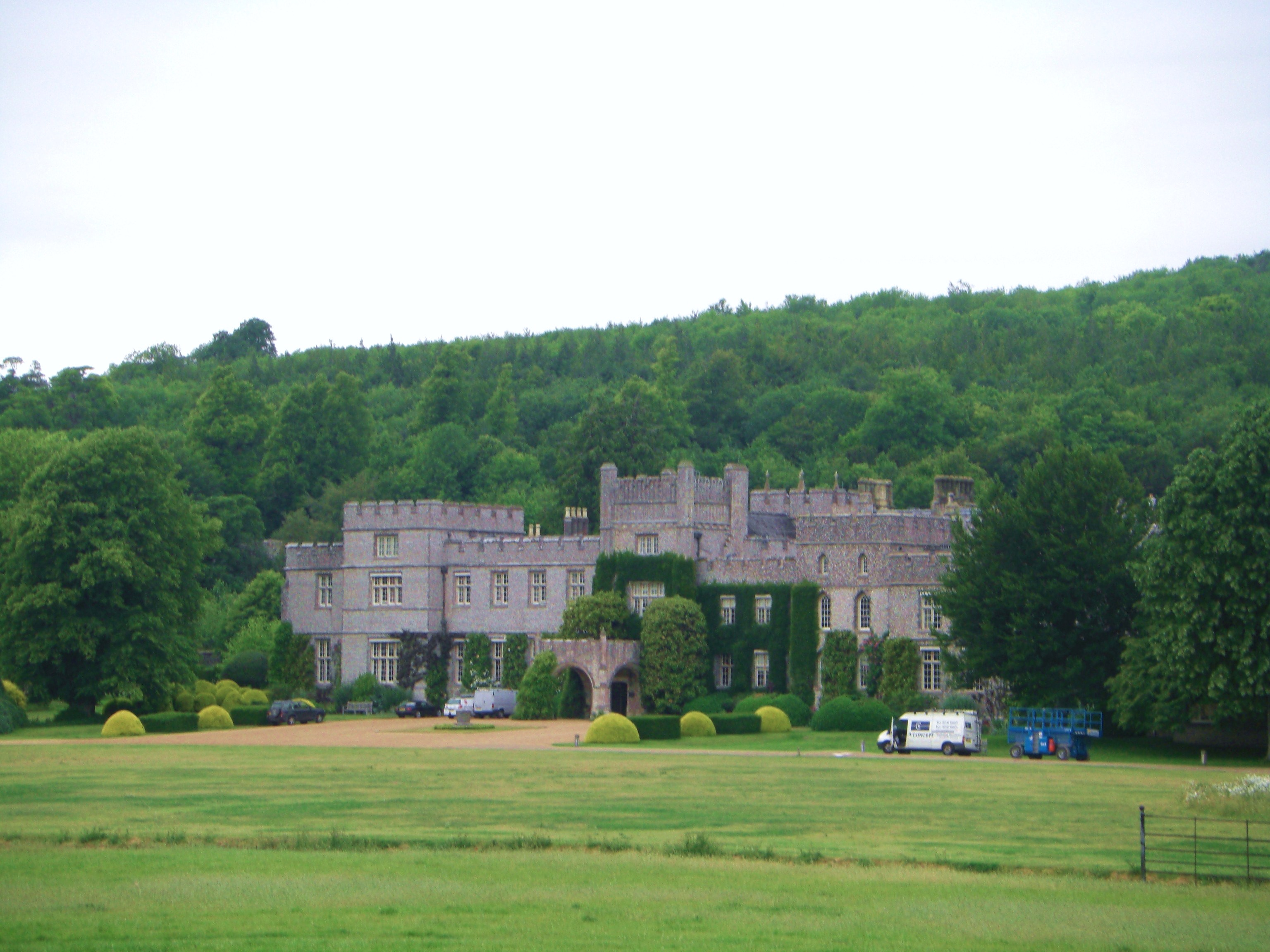
- West Dean House in 2007

- Location within West Sussex

General information
- Location: West Dean, West Sussex, England
- Coordinates: 50°54′22″N 0°46′31″W
- Year built: 1804
- Renovated: 1893 (extended)

Design and construction
- Architect: James Wyatt

Listed Building – Grade II*
- Official name: West Dean College West Dean Park
- Designated: 19 July 1985
- Reference no.: 1026116

National Register of Historic Parks and Gardens
- Official name: West Dean
- Designated: 1 June 1984
- Reference no.: 1000190

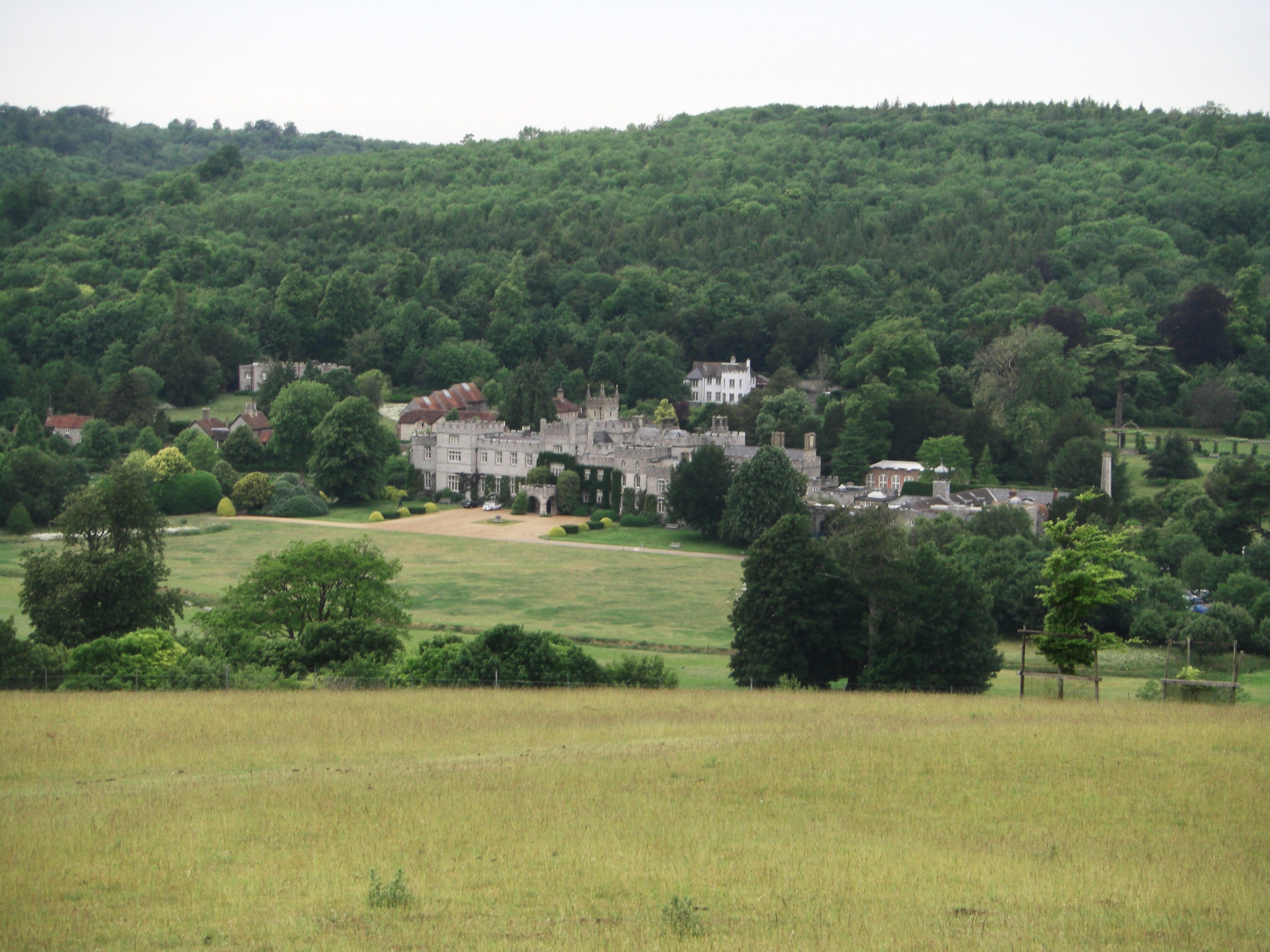
West Dean House and its surrounding buildings.

West Dean House is a large flint-faced manor house situated in West Dean, West Sussex, England, near the historic city of Chichester. The country estate has approximately 6,350 acres (25.7 km^{2}) of land and dates back to 1086, with various royal connections throughout the years. In 1971 the estate became the home of West Dean College, a centre of study of conservation, arts, crafts, writing, gardening, and music.

West Dean is Grade II* listed on the National Heritage List for England, and its landscaped park and gardens are equally listed Grade II* on the Register of Historic Parks and Gardens.

== History ==
=== The medieval estate ===
The earliest known reference to the West Dean Estate is found in the Domesday Book in 1086, where it was included in the manor of Singleton as, a forest and hunting park. The Earls of Arundel and the Dukes of Norfolk held these lands for almost 500 years until 1572, when Thomas Howard, 4th Duke of Norfolk was accused of treason. He was stripped of his possessions by Elizabeth I and then beheaded. She later restored the properties and title to the Duke's eldest son Philip. It was Philip who built the first manor house at West Dean in 1603, then known as Earl's Court, later to be renamed Canon House due to its connections to Chichester Cathedral.

=== The Jacobean manor ===
In 1621 Philip sold the manor and it passed into various ownerships, including the Sussex families of John Aylwin of Lewes and Richard Lewkenor of Stoughton. It was John Lewkenor in 1622 who built the Jacobean manor house, on the site that was previously occupied by the medieval building. The building was built in an E-shape, common in the late 16th century.

=== The Peachey family ===
St Roches' Arboretum at West Dean

In 1738 the West Dean Estate passed into the hands of the Peachey family from Petworth, just over the South Downs. James Peachey, 1st Baron Selsey, commissioned the leading architect of the time, James Wyatt, to rebuild the manor house, creating the core flint mansion seen at West Dean today. Wyatt is also responsible for the orangery on the West Dean estate. James went on to gain a vast acreage of land, leaving it to his son, John Peachey, 2nd Baron Selsey on his death. John was responsible for laying out the parkland and arboretum in West Dean. All of John's children were without heirs, and in 1871 the last Peachey died. Recently there has been a link made with the Peachey family of Portsmouth.

=== The James family ===
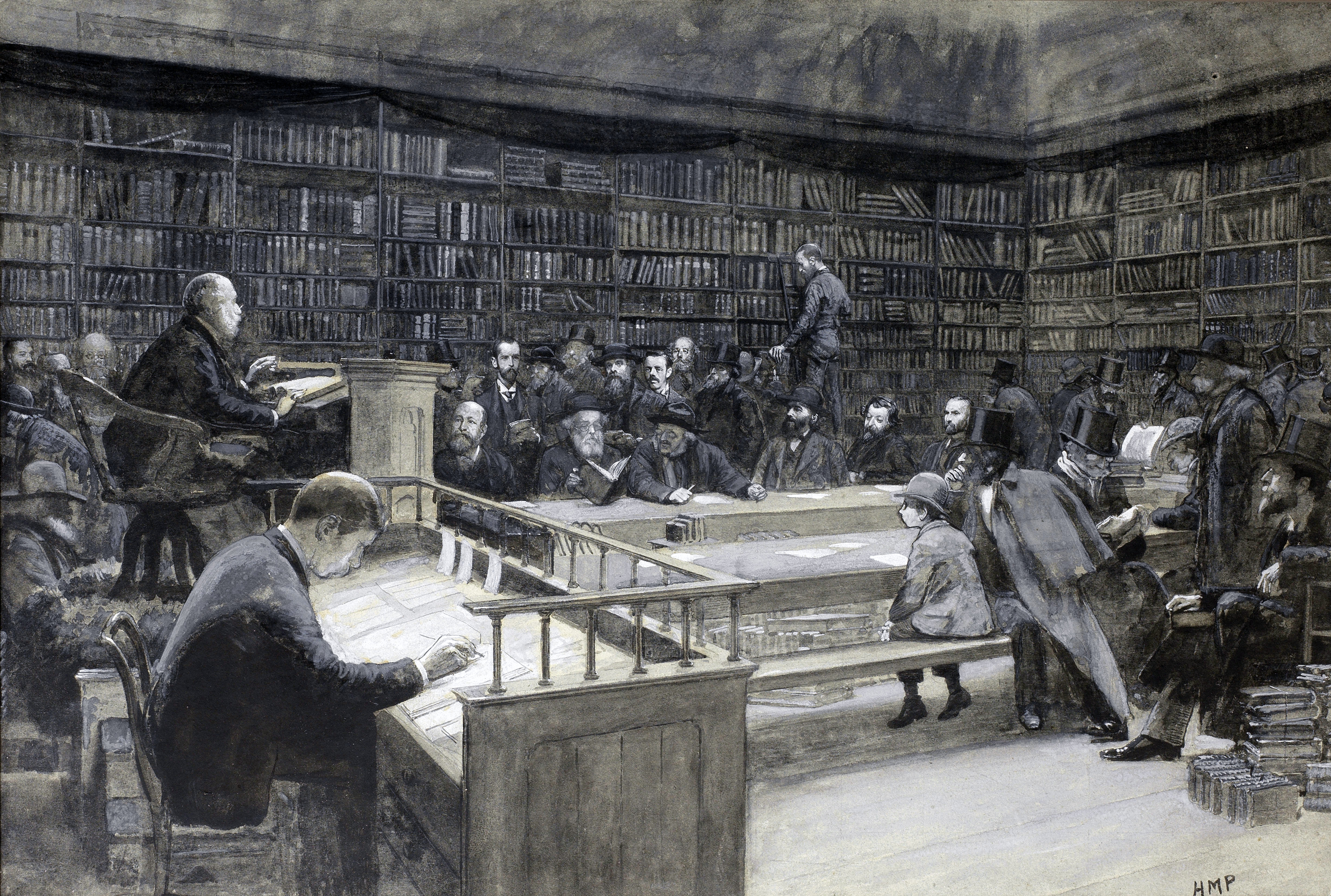
A book sale in progress at Messrs Sotheby, Wilkinson & Hodge of Wellington Street, 1888.

In 1891 West Dean became the home of newly married William (Willie) Dodge James and Evelyn Forbes the daughter of Sir Charles Forbes, a Scottish aristocrat. William James had inherited great wealth from his father, American-born Liverpool-based merchant Daniel James. He bought West Dean from Frederick Bowers, a merchant who had owned the property since the death of its previous owner, Caroline Mary (Peachey) Vernon Harcourt (1785–1871). She had inherited the estate when her brother, Henry John Peachey, 3rd Baron Selsey died in 1838. Caroline was the wife of Leveson Venables Vernon Harcourt, son of Edward Venables-Vernon-Harcourt, Archbishop of York. In her will she had bequeathed West Dean to a distant relative, Ulick de Burgh, 1st Marquess of Clanricarde, who immediately sold it to Frederick Bowers. Clanricarde also disposed of several other properties left to him by Caroline plus the extensive library housed at West Dean, the sale of which took nine days at Sotheby's and included a copy of John Gower's rare Confessio Amantis that sold for £670.

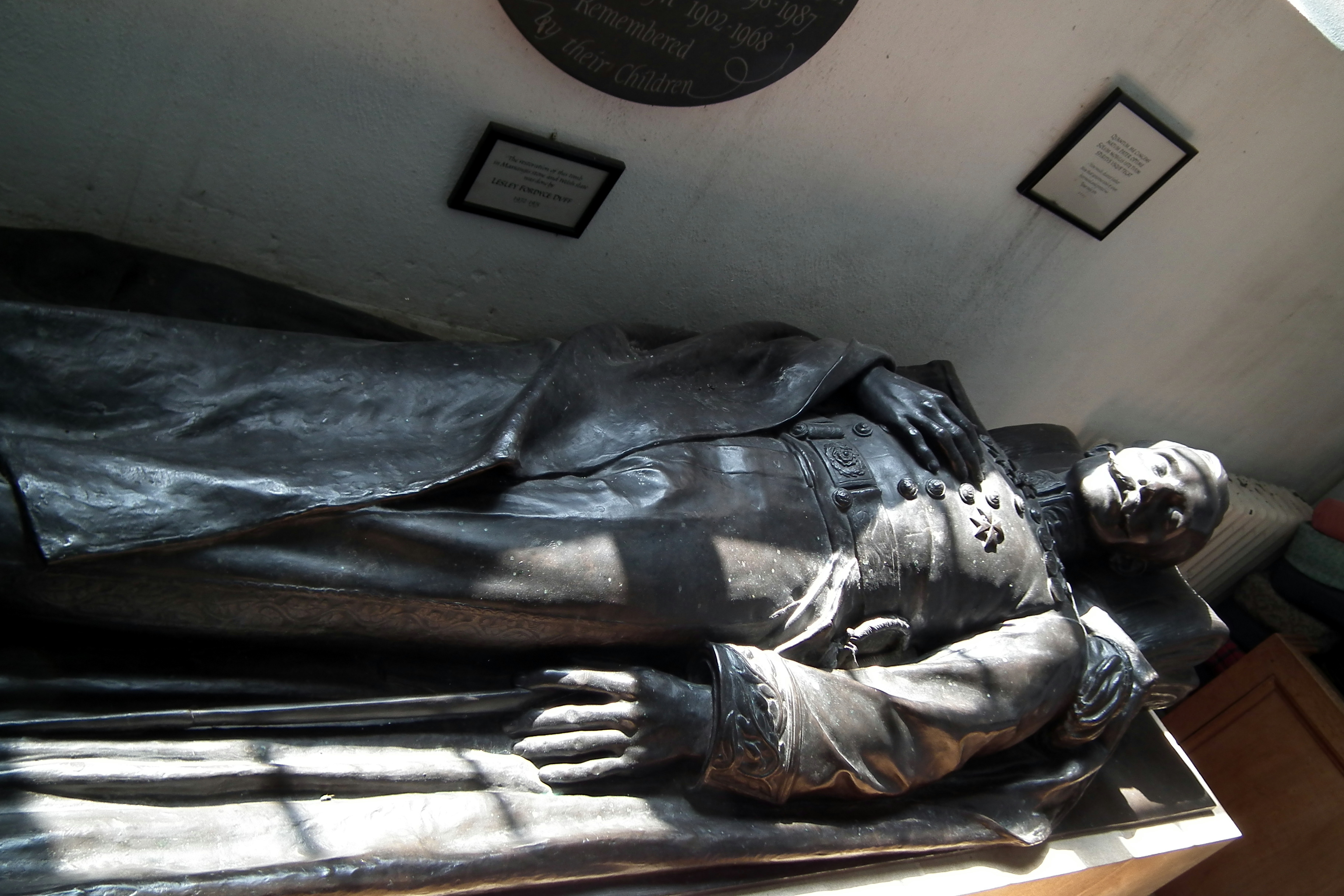
William Dodge James; St Andrew's Church, West Dean, West Sussex

When James moved to the West Dean Estate in 1891, he set about altering and greatly extending the house and commissioned Ernest George and Harold Peto to do so. George helped embellish the state rooms and Peto designed a 300-foot (91 m)-long pergola, still a highlight of the gardens today. West Dean House became one of the largest flint structures in the country. The interior of the house reflects William and his brothers Frank and Arthur's passion for big game hunting, with souvenirs of their visits to Africa, Arabia, and Afghanistan displayed throughout the house.

House parties at West Dean were attended by the Prince of Wales - who became King Edward VII when his mother Queen Victoria died. He was William James's son Edward James's godfather and a regular participant of pheasant and partridge shoots on the West Dean estate. The Prince of Wales had a group of rich and entertaining friends that became known as the Marlborough House set and included people like Evelyn and her sister-in-law Mary Venetia James (née Cavendish-Bentinck).

William and Evelyn had five children, four girls, Millicent, Alexandra, Silvia, and Audrey. In 1907 after 18 years of marriage, their son and heir Edward James was born.

William became Deputy Lieutenant of Sussex in 1892. and High Sheriff of Sussex in 1897 He was also appointed Commander of the Royal Victorian Order by Edward VII in 1908.

==== Edward James ====
Edward James was born on 16 August 1907, the only son of William Dodge James. His mother was Evelyn Forbes, a Scots socialite, who was reputedly fathered by the Prince of Wales (later Edward VII). Edward James had four older sisters: Audrey, Millicent, Xandra, and Silvia. He was educated briefly at Eton, and then at Le Rosey in Switzerland, followed by Christ Church, Oxford, where he was a contemporary of Evelyn Waugh and Harold Acton. In 1912 he inherited the 8,000-acre (32 km^{2}) West Dean House, on the death of his father. He was only aged four at the death of his father in March of that year; however Edward did not take control of the estate until he was 25.

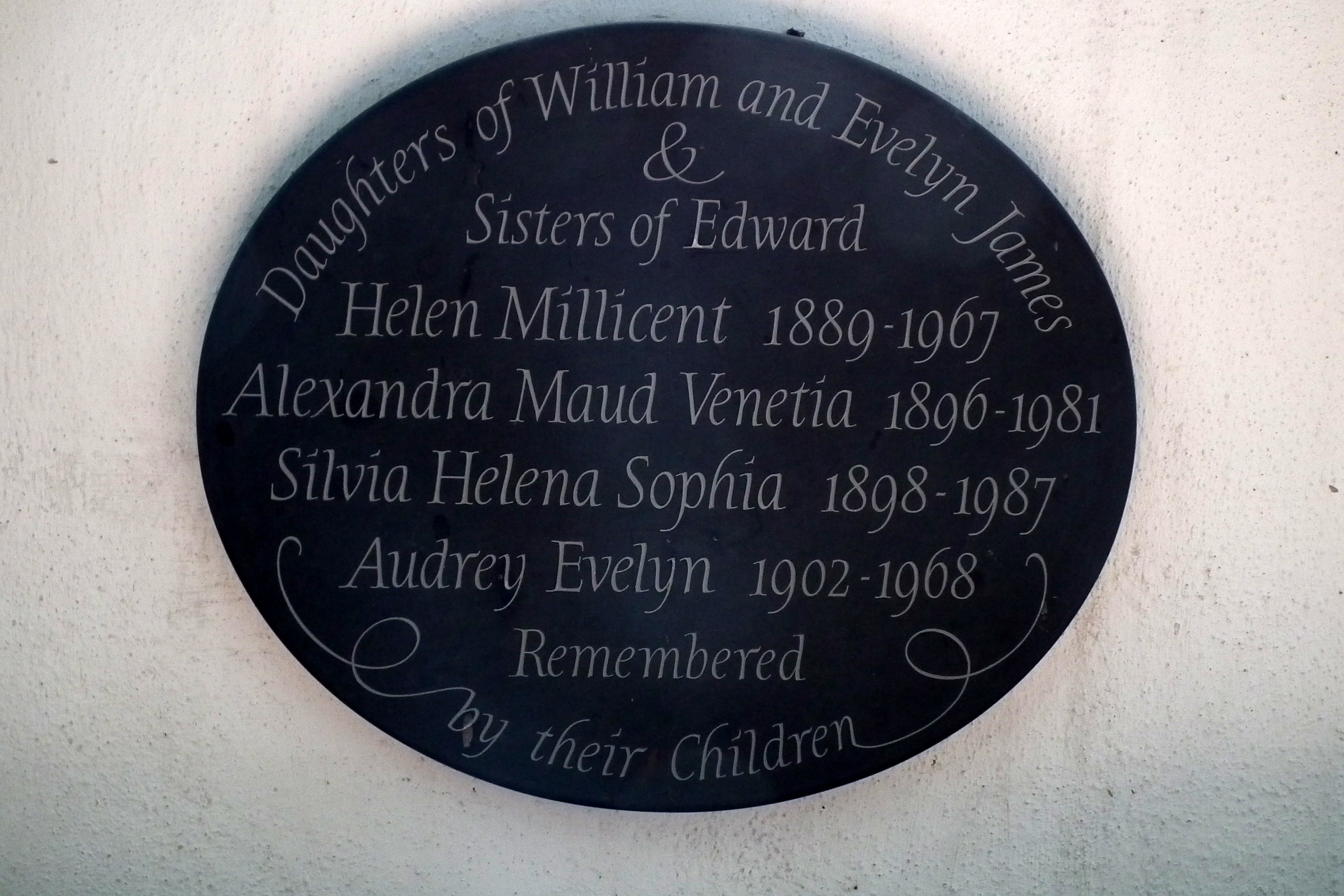
St Andrew's West Dean, West Sussex

In 1939 Edward James wrote to Aldous Huxley expressing his fear that after the war, certain arts, and particularly the techniques of the craftsmen would be lost. As a solution James suggested that his estate be set up as an educational community where the techniques of craftsmanship could be preserved and taught, whilst restoring old work and creating new art works.

=== Wispers School ===
In 1956 Wispers School, an independent boarding school for girls aged between 11 and 18, moved to West Dean House. In 1964 James gave the house to a charitable trust, The Edward James Foundation, but the school was able to remain at West Dean until 1968.

=== West Dean College ===
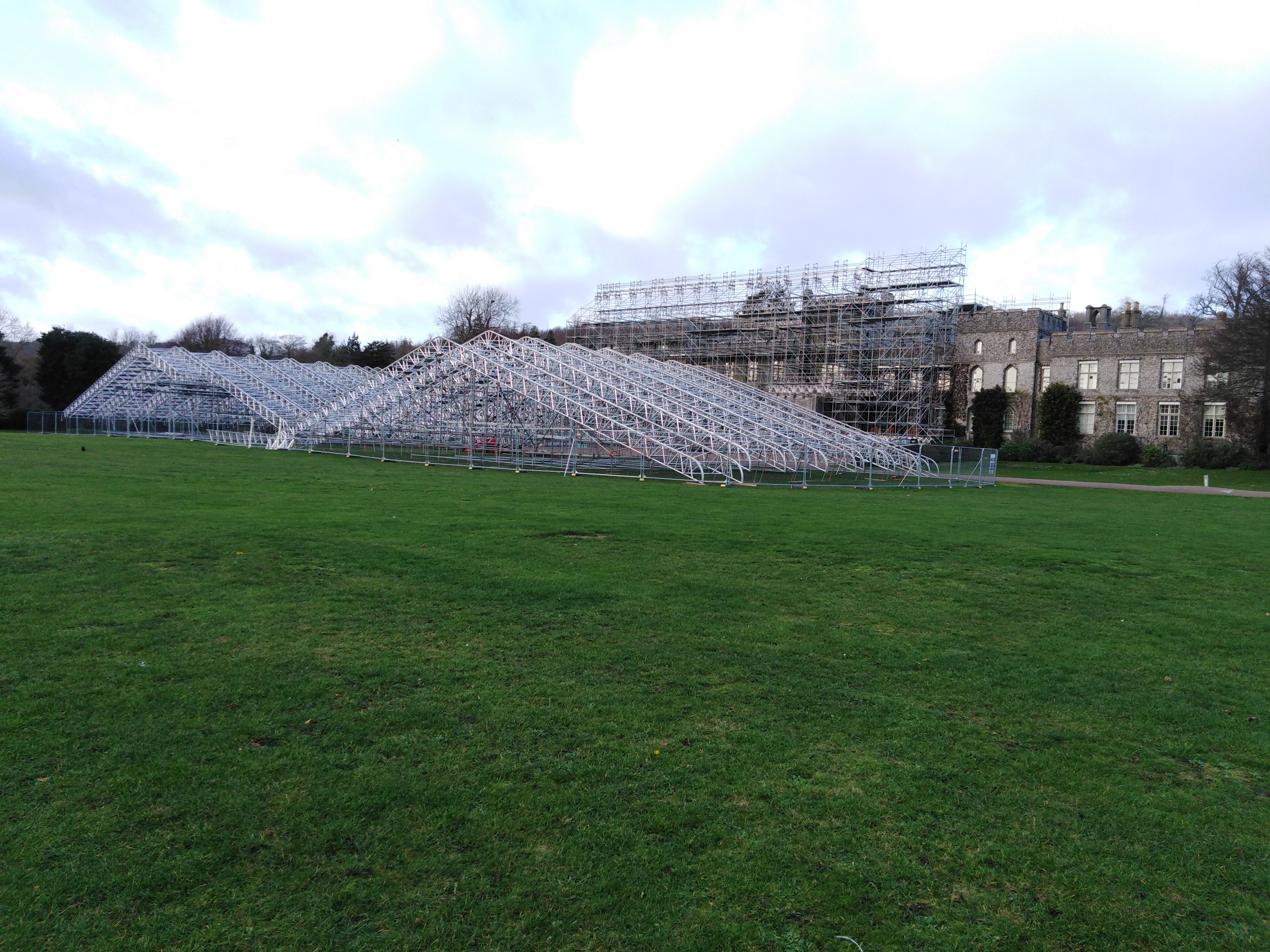
Pre-fabricated temporary roofing structure ready to be lifted onto West Dean House's roof 2018/19

The Edward James Foundation was established in 1964 as a charitable, educational trust which supports and teaches artists and craftsmen and in 1971 the foundation established West Dean College which offers full-time and short courses.

Since the house became a college, extensive alterations and additions have been made to the bedrooms and former service areas of the house, in order to make it suitable for students. Roofing over the former stable yard and the surrounding buildings has enabled arts and crafts workshops to be built. All the work took place over a period of 20 years, directed by architect John Warren, who tried to retain the historical features of the house.

Major repair and improvement work was due to be carried out on the roof in 2019. A planning application was made to the South Downs National Park in 2017.

== West Dean Gardens ==
The award-winning West Dean Gardens surround the West Dean Estate in the South Downs. Head Gardener Jim Buckland and his wife Sarah Wain restored the gardens after they suffered severe damage in the 1987 and 1990 storms. The gardens have been awarded an English Heritage Garden Grade of II*. West Dean features a restored walled kitchen garden with 13 Victorian glasshouses. Robin Lane Fox in the Financial Times said "West Dean has a large walled kitchen garden whose standards are wonderfully high. Greenhouse after greenhouse smiles with top-class plants, fruit and rarities."

A key feature in the gardens is the 300 ft (91 m) Edwardian pergola, designed by Harold Peto. The arboretum has the grave of Edward James with the carved memorial stone by John Skelton.

A visitors centre was completed in 1995. The building, which includes a gift shop and restaurant and adjoined by terraces and gardens, was designed by Christopher Alexander and colleagues. The building's exterior walls are constructed of brick, local flint, and concrete.

== The West Dean estate ==
The West Dean estate has approximately 6,350 acres (25.7 km^{2}) of land. The estate has 136 houses and cottages, as well as more than 100 farm buildings; some are occupied by the staff of the estate and college, as well as by pensioners of the foundation and local families. There are twelve farms on the estate, many of which have been owned by the estate for generations; their agricultural activates are split between livestock and cereals.

Woodlands make up around 2,000 acres (8.1 km^{2}) of the estate, the main tree species being the native beech, found on the South Downs. The woodlands were badly affected by the storms of 1987 and 1990, and the woodland took over a decade to recover. The woodlands have become increasingly important, particularly when they began to supply the key fuel to provide heating for the estate in the 1970s. After the old boilers and electric heaters proved to be incapable with dealing with the needs of the ever growing West Dean College, other methods were looked into, and wood fuel appeared to be the most eco-friendly alternative. One thousand two hundred tonnes of wood chippings are needed to supply not only West Dean College, but several other buildings on the estate as well, including the village church. The woodland also conceals a rich heritage with sites like Goosehill Camp dating back to the Iron Age.

=== Monkton House ===
On the wider estate, William James commissioned Edwin Lutyens to build a subsidiary house, Monkton House. Built in 1902, the house was redesigned by Edward James in the 1930s, who engaged Christopher Nicholson and Hugh Casson, and was assisted by Salvador Dalí, to create a rare example of a Surrealist country house.

=== The Weald and Downland Living Museum ===
The Weald and Downland Open Air Museum was launched in 1967 by a group of enthusiasts led by the museum's founder, the late J.R. Armstrong. The land for the museum was gifted from his estate by Edward James, at a peppercorn rent. The objective was to rescue vernacular buildings that would otherwise have been demolished. The museum first opened to the public on 5 September 1970.

The principle of an open-air museum was well established in Scandinavia as a way to create a three-dimensional setting for explaining the way of living or working. Open-air museums allowed the buildings to give context to the techniques, equipment, furnishings, clothes and art of the period.

== See also ==
- Grade II* listed buildings in West Sussex
- Surrealism
