= Daniel James (businessman) =

American British businessman

- Daniel James
- Born: 17 April 1801; Truxton, New York
- Died: 27 November 1876 (aged 75); Woolton, Liverpool.
- Resting place: Liverpool
- Citizenship: 31 May 1866 Naturalized British Citizen
- Partner(s): Elizabeth Woodbridge Phelps; Sophia Hall Hitchcock; Ruth Lancaster Dickinson
- Children: Mother Elizabeth James: Anson Green Phelps James (1829-1842); Daniel Willis James (1832-1907); Elizabeth Eggleston James (1833-1868); Olivia Phelps (James) Hoe (1837-1935); Henry Stokes James (1839 died at 3 months).; Mother Sophia Hall James: Frank Linsly James (1851-1890); John Arthur James (1853-1917); William Dodge James (1854-1912).
- Parent(s): Nathaniel Emmes James; Betsey Ingersoll

Daniel James (17 April 1801 – 2 November 1876) was one of the three founder partners of Phelps, Dodge & Co., a New York trading organisation established in 1833/4, exporting cotton to England and importing manufactured goods in return such as tin, tin plate, iron and copper. James was born in America but was to live in Liverpool for 47 years running the British side of the business called Phelps, James & Co. The company was to dominate the export market of tinplate from the United Kingdom for three-quarters of a century at a time when Wales was the centre of world production.

== Early life ==
Daniel James, born in Truxton, New York, was a wholesale grocer who in 1829 married Elizabeth Woodbridge Phelps (born 1807) daughter of merchant Anson Greene Phelps (born 1781). In 1831, Daniel moved to Liverpool with his wife to replace Anson Phelps's existing partner – Elisha Peck – who had spent fifteen years in the job and wanted to return to America.

== Partnership ==
The Phelps, Peck & Co partnership ended in 1833, when the building housing their New York warehouse collapsed. To revive the business Phelps set up the partnership with his two sons-in-law Daniel James and William Earle Dodge, Sr., forming Phelps, Dodge & Co. in the US and Phelps, James & Co. in England. Phelps was the senior partner in this arrangement with a two-thirds interest and the remainder split between the sons-in-law.

In 1837 Phelps's daughter Caroline (1812–1881), whose fiancé, Josiah Stokes, had been killed in the building collapse, married his brother James and he would eventually (in 1847) be the third son-in-law of Anson G Phelps to join the organisation as a partner with a 15% share. He would leave in 1878 to enter the banking business.

The American side of the business was to remain in family control into the next century, although in Britain Daniel James made his assistant - Thomas Morris Banks (b 1796) - a partner in Phelps, James & Co.

When their father-in-law Phelps died in 1853, Daniel James and William Earle Dodge Sr. purchased his holdings and absorbed his son's share when he died some years later. James would continue to live in England but was said to have gone frequently to America for extended holidays and consultation with his partners.

From about 1835 Phelps, Dodge & Co. were heavily involved with selling timber extracted from lands they had purchased in Pennsylvania and it became their largest subsidiary operation. Daniel James's brother, Henry (1821–1897), joined this business in about 1842, and eventually ran the outlet operation for Phelps, Dodge from Baltimore under the company name of Henry James & Co.

== Life in Liverpool ==
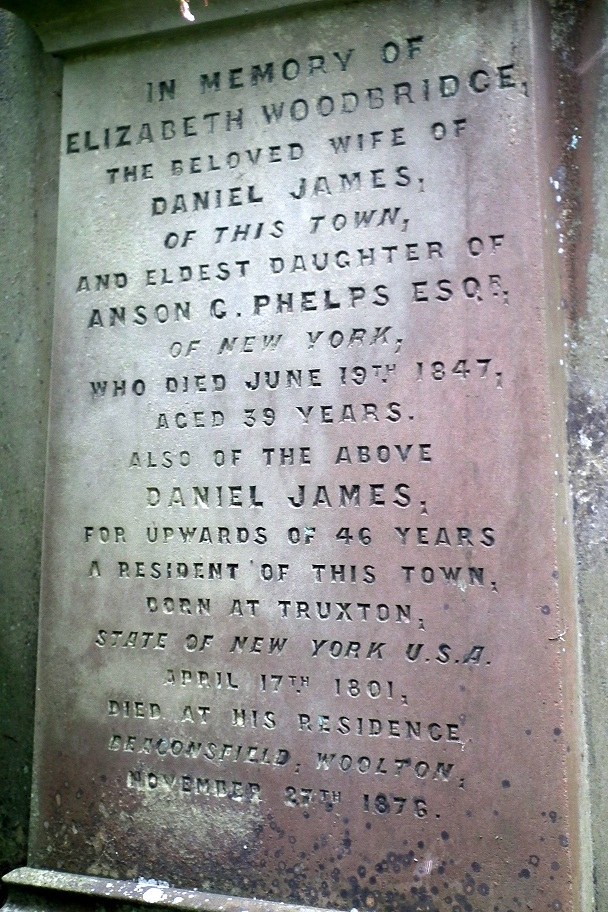
Elizabeth and Daniel James gravestone, originally located in Liverpool, now in St Andrew's churchyard, West Dean, West Sussex, UK. Their remains were not disturbed. (see text: "Final Resting Place")

In the first few years of business Daniel James faced difficult times in Liverpool. A recession that started in 1837 in both America and Britain brought the company to the point of ruin and lasted several years. His wife died in 1847 and his eldest son was killed in a carriage accident whilst visiting his grandfather in America. Daniel remarried in 1849 to Sophia Hitchcock. At this time his surviving son - Daniel Willis James - moved to America to further his education and become a member of Phelps, Dodge & Co.

Daniel and Sofia had three children: Frank Linsly (b. 1851 d.1890), John Arthur (b. 1853 d.1917) and William Dodge (b. 1854 d.1912) who all grew up and were educated in Britain. Linsly became an explorer and was killed in Africa by a wounded elephant in 1890. Both Arthur and William married into British society and lived in English country houses on the inherited wealth of their father. Arthur's main residence was Coton House near Rugby and William's was West Dean House, West Sussex.

The death of Frank came as a terrible blow to both Arthur and his brother William. As a memorial, he and Arthur funded the building of a hospital for mariners in the town of East Cowes, Isle of Wight, named the Frank James Memorial Hospital.

Sophia Hall Hitchcock died in 1870 and in 1871, Daniel James married his children’s former governess Ruth Lancaster Dickinson (b. 1824-d.1907).

In 1866 Daniel James took British citizenship in order to buy the house that became his final home - Beaconsfield, Woolton, Liverpool.

=== Cotton famine relief ===
In 1862 the import of cotton to the UK dried up due to the blockade of the Confederate ports by the Union's navy during the civil war. This resulted in great hardship for the workers and families associated with the cotton manufacturing industry. Relief funds were set up in the northern states of America to support the UK cotton workers. Donation were made by American businesses and individuals amounting to $350,000, and this was used to purchase foodstuffs in America including flour and preserved meats. Daniel James was appointed the chairman of the Liverpool committee, responsible for receiving the shipments, offloading and distributing the food. In addition he negotiated with transport companies and government agencies to exempt charges and duties where possible in the UK.

== Legacy ==
During the recession that started in 1837, Daniel James was faced with insolvency in England whilst his partners were investing in lumber and metal manufacturing in American. He wrote to his brother-in-law that "a merchant ought not to be a manufacturer". Again in 1857 a similar situation arose and this time his son expressed concern: “The place for all the Capital we have is in the business, and not in pine lands, factories, Lackawanna R R or Iron concerns”. Daniel James was a worrier and unlike his partners did not have the inclination or temperament for risk taking. However, he was suited to be a merchant and a very good one. From 1833 to 1873 his Liverpool end of the business procured and exported over $300,000,000 worth of metal to America, he also imported and sold cotton to the mills in Lancashire. In 1859 his long term friend and business partner in Liverpool - Thomas Banks - died.

New York Tribune Almanac, 1876

Phelps, James & Co. dominated the export of tinplate from the UK. In America the imported tinplate was used for manufacturing such things as roofing, tools, machinery, cans, cutlery, skillets, pots, pans, pitchers, plates, washing boards, bathtubs, etc.

Daniel James continued to run the business until his death in 1876 leaving a solid foundation from which the next generation would build, not in mercantile. During the 1880s and beyond his son and William E Dodge Jr. developed vast copper mining enterprises in Arizona and extending railroads to meet the growing demands from an expanding USA.

Two years after Daniel James died, his partner William E Dodge Sr. retired and the Stokes family left the business. On 31 December 1878 the existing Phelps, James & Co partnership officially 'expired'. Charles Berjew Brooke became the representative in the UK for Phelps James & Co for the final 25 years of its existence. and the business was eventually closed on 31 December 1906.

Daniel James, like his partners was a religious man. He met preacher Charles Grandison Finney in New York during the 1830s when Daniel's father-in-law - Anson G Phelps - had rented and later purchased church buildings for him. Finney records in his memoirs that when he visited England in 1857 he stayed with Daniel James in Liverpool. Legacies in Daniel James's will included sums for the American Board of Commissioners for Foreign Missions and London Missionary Society.

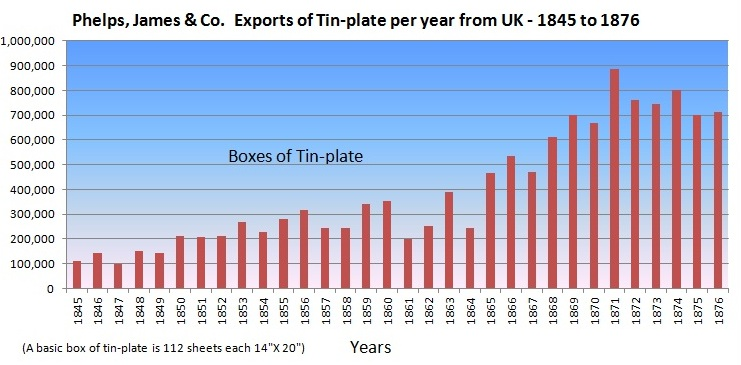
Tinplate Exports; Ref: Chronology of the Tinplate Works of Great Britain by Edward Henry Brookes 1944 pp.1

== Moiety scandal ==
In December 1872, Daniel James arrived at his office to be greeted by a newspaper article that read: "Phelps, Dodge & Co., New York. — This great firm have had their books and papers seized by the United States for alleged frauds on the revenue to the amount of $1,750,000." The shock was such that there were concerns for his health and even a year later he had not fully recovered.

The events that led up to this involved a Phelps Dodge employee in New York who noticed a discrepancy in the declaration made to the Customs House. This resulted in an underpayment of import duty. He removed the pages from the ledger and took them to an agent of the Custom House called B. G. Jayne. He was empowered in law to seize the entire value of the import from Phelps Dodge if the case against them was proven. The Custom House received 50% of any money recovered in this way and the remainder was split between Jayne, his associates and the informer. This system had been in place for many years and was referred to as Moiety. Jayne made an unannounced visit to the Phelps Dodge office and seized their books. Later he informed them that they were liable to pay a forfeit of $1,750,000. Without access to his ledgers, the senior partner of the firm, William E. Dodge, was unable to verify the underpayment of duty and was forced to reach a settlement with Jayne of $271,000.

When the ledgers were returned to Phelps Dodge they discovered that the underpayment was as little as $1664.68. The reason for this discrepancy had been the difference of the value of the goods declared in Liverpool and the eventual market value in America, which had fallen. The apparent injustice of the fine against Phelps Dodge, one of the most respected merchant firms in America, became a public scandal. William E. Dodge appeared before the House of Representatives' Ways and Means Committee in Washington in 1874 when they investigated the Moiety system. Jayne was also called and he was questioned about his associates and eventually admitted that the lawyer he used was General Benjamin Franklin Butler. He was asked to appear before the committee but due to illness refused. At a later date (June 19, 1874) Butler addressed the House of Representatives on the matter and was highly critical of Phelps Dodge and in particular Daniel James. However, his accusations were totally unfounded in fact and other members of the House rounded on him. His speech also gave member of the House the opportunity to raise the issue of his involvement in the Sanborn scandal where large sums of recovered Government money went into private hands.

See also the article Anti-Moiety Acts for additional information.

== Final Resting Place ==
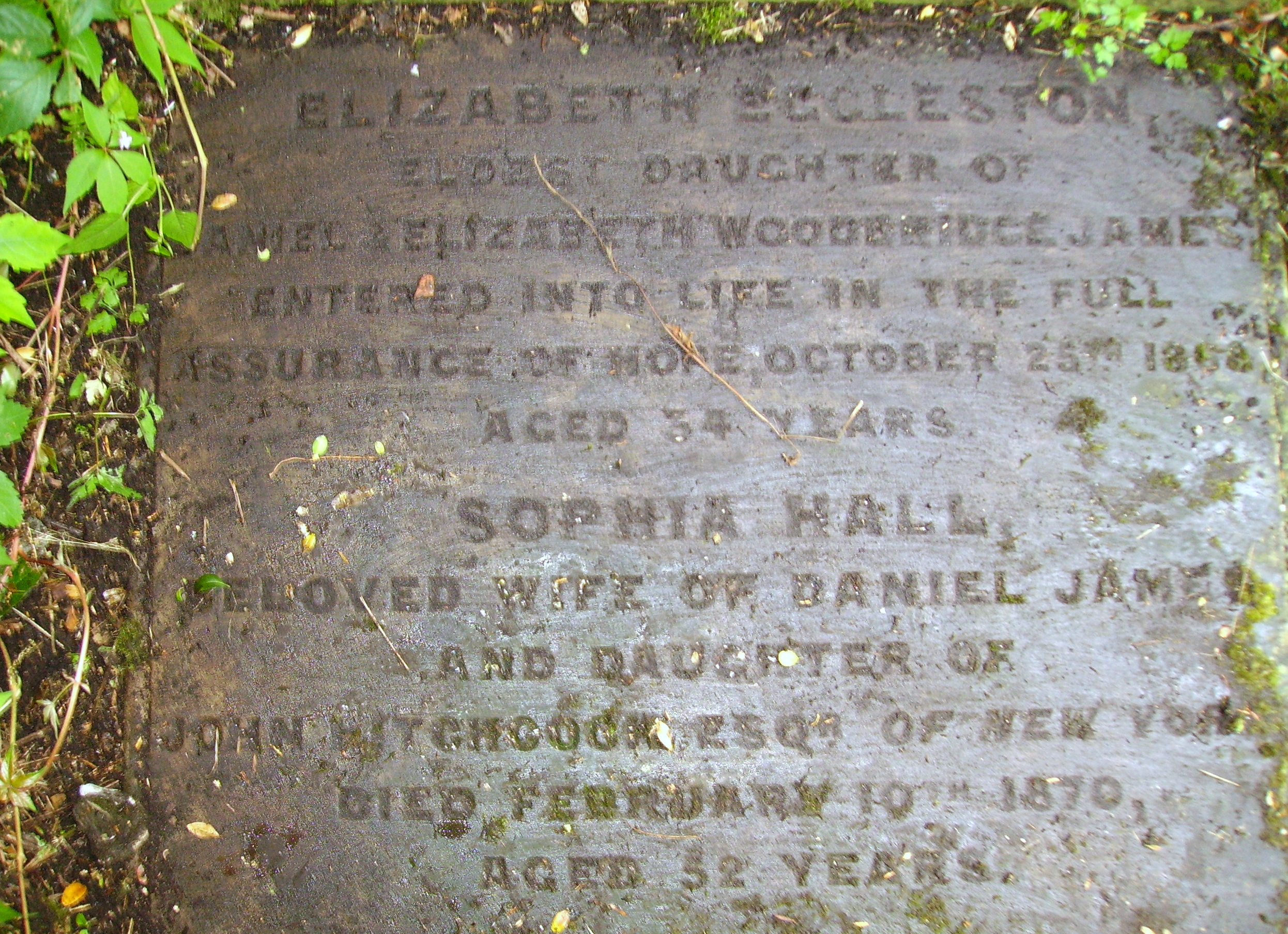
Gravestone of Elizabeth Eccleston James and Sophia (Hitchcock) James, St Andrew's churchyard, West Dean, West Sussex, UK. The stone was removed from Liverpool Necropolis - their remains were not disturbed (see text).

Just as Daniel James became successful he lost his first wife Elizabeth. She had not enjoyed the best of health and died in 1847. She was buried in the Liverpool Necropolis, a cemetery built on the outskirts of the expanding and overcrowded city. Daniel remarried in 1849 to Sophia Hitchcock and when she died in 1870 she was also buried in the Necropolis. Daniel married for a third time at the age of 70 to his children’s former governess. However, she would have known that he still deeply loved his first wife Elizabeth as he chose to be buried with her, and when he died in 1876 his wish was granted.

By 1890, the sheer number of burials in the Necropolis had created unsanitary conditions in the surrounding area. The council took control of the site and over a period of several years turned it into a park. The bodies of those buried there were not exhumed but the gravestones and memorials were removed. It was at this time that Daniel’s son from his second marriage – William Dodge James - arranged for the gravestones to be transferred to the church (St Andrew's) just behind his house in West Dean, where they remain today. At the foot of Daniel and Elizabeth's stone is that of Daniel's second wife Sofia, and daughter from his first marriage - Elizabeth Eccleston James.

Family of Daniel James

Elizabeth Woodbridge Phelps (1807-1847)				Daniel James (1801-1876)			Sophia Hall Hitchcock (1820-1870)
Anson Greene Phelps James (1830-1842)	Daniel Willis James (1832-1907) m.1854 Ellen Stebbins Curtiss (1833-1916)	Elizabeth Eggleston James (1833-1868)	Olivia James (1837-1935) m.1863 Robert Hoe III (1839-1909)	Henry James (1839-1839)	Frank Linsly James (1851-1890)	John Arthur James (1853-1917) m.1885 Mary Venetia Cavendish-Bentinck (1861-1948)	William Dodge James (1854-1912) m.1889 Evelyn Elizabeth Forbes (1867-1927)

== See also ==
- Ansonia, Connecticut
- Ansonia Clock Company
- Ansonia Brass & Battery Company
- Copper Queen Mine
- Morenci, Arizona
- El Paso and Southwestern Railroad
- James Douglas
- Joint Land and Lumber Company
- Lackawanna Coal & Iron Co
- Bust by John MacBride (1819 - 1890)

== Sources ==
- Cleland, Robert Glass (1952). A History of Phelps Dodge. New York: Alfred A Knopf. ASIN B0007DMY86.
- Dodge, Phyllis B (June 1987). Tales of the Phelps Dodge Family. New York: New York Historical Society. OCLC 16685138.
- Lowitt, Richard (1954). A Merchant Prince of the Nineteenth Century. Columbia University Press. ASIN B001DJ0E5S.
