= Arthur James (racehorse owner) =

British merchant and aristocrat (1853–1917)

- Born: 1853
- Died: 1917 (aged 63–64)
- Spouse: Mary Venetia Cavendish-Bentinck (m. 1885)
- Parent(s): Daniel James; Sophia Hall Hitchcock

John Arthur James, MVO DL (1853–1917) was the son of a wealthy Liverpool merchant who became a friend of the Prince of Wales (later King Edward VII), sharing his interest in horse racing. In 1885 he married Mary Venetia Cavendish-Bentinck (1861–1948), godmother to Queen Elizabeth The Queen Mother.

== Early years ==
James’s parents were Daniel and Sophia James, Americans living in Liverpool, England. He was educated privately at Woodbridge in Suffolk and admitted to Trinity College, Cambridge, on 24 February 1870 graduating BA in 1874.

After his father died in 1876, James joined the family business, but left in 1879. He enjoyed a period of bachelorhood with his two brothers, Frank and William, living in London, shooting in Scotland and big game hunting in Africa. Together they traveled the continent of Africa, and Frank, who was a Fellow of the Royal Geographical Society, published details on their return.

== Horseracing ==
In 1885 James married Mary Venetia Cavendish-Bentinck, who was the daughter of George Cavendish-Bentinck and Prudentia Penelope Leslie. They lived in Grafton Street, London, and Coton House near Rugby where they bred racehorses.

On the racetrack their successes included:

- Goodwood Cup: 1901 Fortunatus; 1902 Perseus; 1903 Rabelais.
- Coronation Stakes: 1899 Fascination.
- New Stakes (Norfolk Stakes): 1899 The Gorgon.
- Windsor Castle Stakes: 1902 Mabon; 1903 Huntly; 1904 Chain Stitch.
- National Breeders Stakes: 1902 Rabelais.
- 2,000 Guineas Stakes: 1906 Gorgos

Venetia James was related to the Duke of Portland, owner of racehorse St. Simon, so it was probably no coincidence that the blood line of many of the foals born at Coton House can be traced back to this great horse. After James died, his wife continued to breed and race; she won the Victoria Cup at Hurst Park Racecourse with Phalaros and Herbalist in successive years and the 1932 Coronation Cup with Salmon Leap.

James, who was a Steward of the Jockey Club, placed his racehorses with trainer Richard Marsh at Egerton House, Newmarket at the same period as the facility was being used by the Prince of Wales (later King Edward VII). James and his wife Venetia were friends with the Prince. Frederick Ponsonby (private secretary to the prince) wrote of this friendship: "he (James) charming, but not having so much in common with the King except racing; she full of humour and high spirits, walking with the King and keeping him amused."

Edward VII found that training his horses with Richard Marsh was a financial burden. Marsh had spent lavishly on his establishment and this was reflected in his charges. At one point Arthur James tried to persuade the prince to move his horses, however, Marsh, fearing the loss of the royal patronage, asked Lillie Langtry to intercede on his behalf. Langtry, who was a friend of the prince, sent for James and told him that she considered it a great responsibility for him to encourage the Prince of Wales to move stables. James, perhaps considering that Langtry’s influence with the king outranked his own, took the hint and allowed the matter to drop.

== Submerging Boat Company ==
In 1891 James was the chairman of The Submerging Boat Company Limited in partnership with naval architect W. C. Storey. Shipbuilder Day, Summers & Co. of Southampton, constructed a submarine for them of a cylindrical design, 96 ft in length, 9 ft 6in in diameter and weighing 126 tons. The vessel, named Nautilus and later renamed Incognita was constructed in iron, with steam engines for surface running and electric motors for use when submerged. The submarine sunk at its moorings before its first trial, and although raised by the insurers, the Submerging Boat Company went bankrupt.

A dispute arose between the designer of the Incognita and the shipbuilder Day, Summers & Co. over who was to blame for the sinking and this dispute went to court. Day, Summers & Co. had some experience of working on ships with similar hull shapes; in 1877 they had modified the Walter S. Winans, a vessel designed by Ross Winans and nicknamed The Cigar Ship. The work they carried out, more than double its length and triple its displacement.

== Public life ==
Arthur James held the following positions in public life:

- Justice of the Peace;
- selected as the Liberal Unionist Party parliamentary candidate in 1892 for the Rugby division of Warwickshire (although failed to be elected);
- Sheriff of Warwickshire for 1916;
- Deputy-lieutenant for Warwickshire;
- Steward of the Jockey Club

He received the following honours:

- Member of the Royal Victorian Order (MVO) appointed by King Edward VII in 1909.
- Knight of Grace of Order of the Hospital of Saint John of Jerusalem in England 13 August 1902.

Both Venetia and Arthur James were generous benefactors to hospitals and other causes.

== Family ==
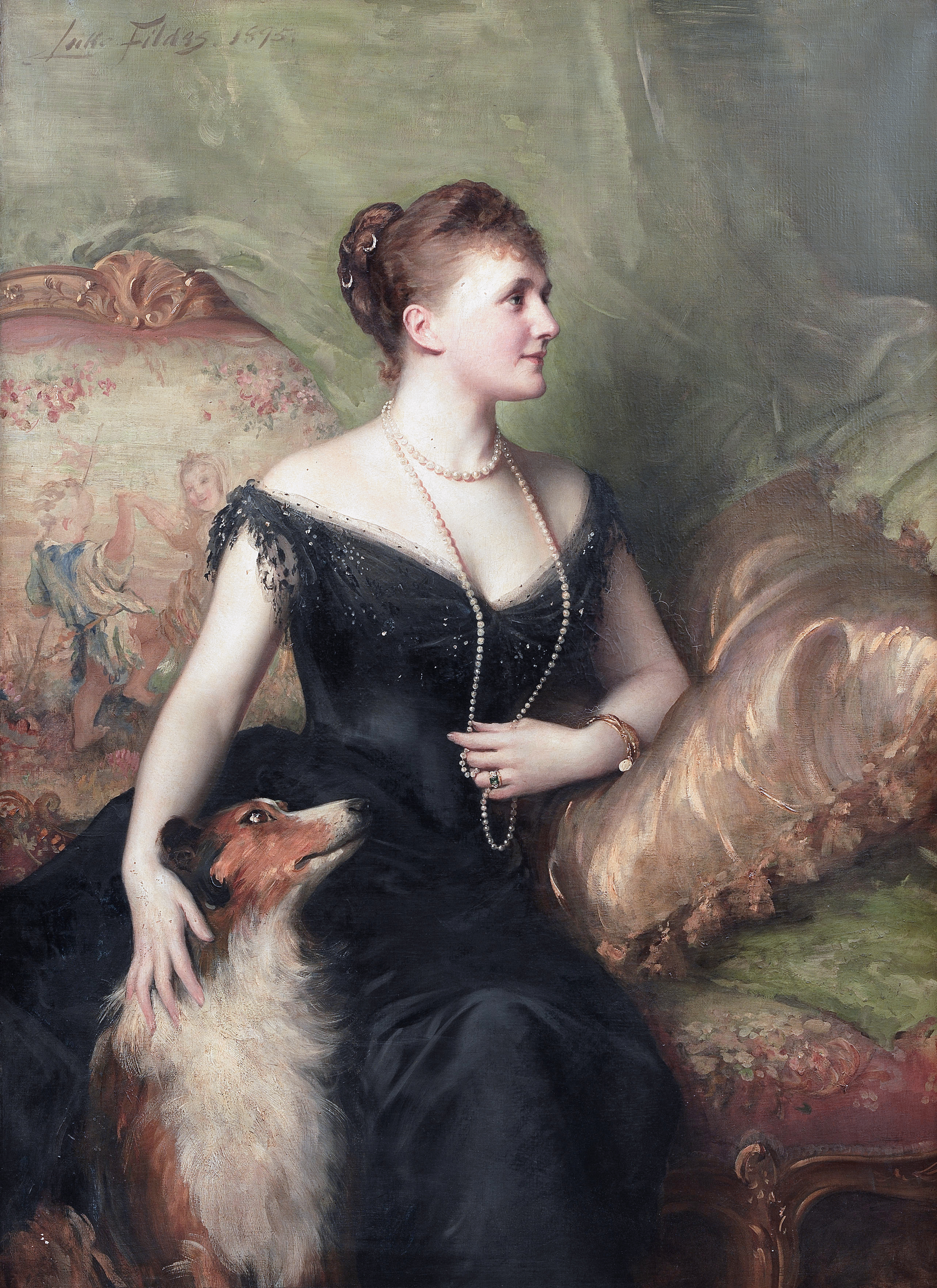
Mrs Mary Venetia James, née Cavendish-Bentinck (Samuel Luke Fildes, 1895)

James died in 1917 and was buried in a cemetery at West Dean, West Sussex, where his two brothers and other members of the family lie, including Venetia. His elder brother, Frank, had died in 1890 from a hunting accident in Africa. The death of Frank came as a terrible blow to both Arthur and his brother William. As a memorial, he and Arthur funded the building of a hospital for mariners in the town of East Cowes, Isle of Wight, named the Frank James Memorial Hospital. William James died in 1912.

Venetia James was related to, and godmother of Elizabeth Angela Marguerite Bowes-Lyon, the future queen consort of the United Kingdom who, following the death of her husband King George VI, became Queen Elizabeth The Queen Mother. When Venetia died in 1948, she left jewellery to Queen Elizabeth and pictures by Titian, Reynolds and Gainsborough to the National Gallery, London.

Arthur and Venetia James were childless. His paternal half brother was Daniel Willis James, co-partner of Phelps, Dodge & Co. His half sister was Olivia James who married Robert Hoe III. His nephew was Edward James.

Family of John Arthur James

Elizabeth Woodbridge Phelps (1807-1847)				Daniel James (1801-1876)			Sophia Hall Hitchcock (1820-1870)
Anson Greene Phelps James (1830-1842)	Daniel Willis James (1832-1907) m.1854 Ellen Stebbins Curtiss (1833-1916)	Elizabeth Eggleston James (1833-1868)	Olivia James (1837-1935) m.1863 Robert Hoe III (1839-1909)	Henry James (1839-1839)	Frank Linsly James (1851-1890)	John Arthur James (1853-1917) m.1885 Mary Venetia Cavendish-Bentinick (1861-1948)	William Dodge James (1854-1912) m.1889 Evelyn Elizabeth Forbes (1867-1927)
