= HMS Waterwitch (1892) =

Sloop of the Royal Navy

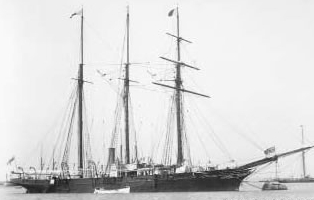
- HMS Waterwitch in 1897

History

United Kingdom
- Name: Lancashire Witch
- Owner: Sir Thomas Hesketh (Note: Later owners were: William Houldsworth (1883–83), Frank Linsly James (1887–88) and William James (1891–92))
- Port of registry: Liverpool, UK
- Builder: Robert Steele & Company, Cartsburn
- Yard number: 107
- Launched: 29 August 1878
- Identification: Official number 78813; Code letters WVPF
- Fate: Sold to the Admiralty

United Kingdom
- Name: HMS Waterwitch
- Acquired: Purchased 17 March 1893
- Fate: Sank in collision at Singapore, 1 September 1912

General characteristics as Lancashire Witch
- Type: Yacht
- Tonnage: 310.57 GRT; 211.19 NRT
- Tons burthen: 479 Thames Measurement
- Length: 160.2 ft (48.8 m)
- Beam: 160.2 ft (48.8 m)
- Depth of hold: 14 ft (4.3 m)
- Installed power: 75 hp (56 kW)
- Propulsion: 2-cylinder compound inverted steam engine; Single screw
- Sail plan: Barquentine rigged

General characteristics as HMS Waterwitch
- Type: Sloop/survey vessel
- Installed power: 450 hp (340 kW)
- Complement: 81

HMS Waterwitch was a British hydrographic survey vessel active in eastern Asian waters from 1894 to 1912. She was a wooden vessel, purchased from a private owner specifically for survey work. She was lost in a collision in Singapore harbour in 1912.

== Construction and acquisition ==
She was built as a private vessel, Lancashire Witch in 1878 by R. Steel & Co of Greenock to a design by St Clare John Byrne for the owner, Sir Thomas George Fermor-Hesketh, 7th Baronet. She was of composite construction, meaning she was built with an iron keel, stem and stern posts, and iron framing, all planked with wooden planking. She was rigged as a three-masted schooner, with square-rigged sails on the foremast only (a "barquentine" rig). A two-cylinder compound inverted steam engine of 75 hp (56 kW) drove a single screw. She was described in Lloyd's Yacht Register as an "auxiliary screw steamer".

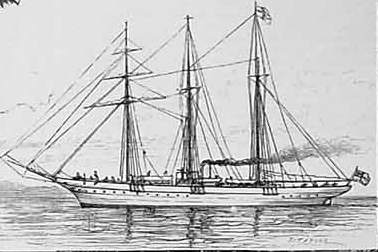
Lancashire Witch approximately 1890

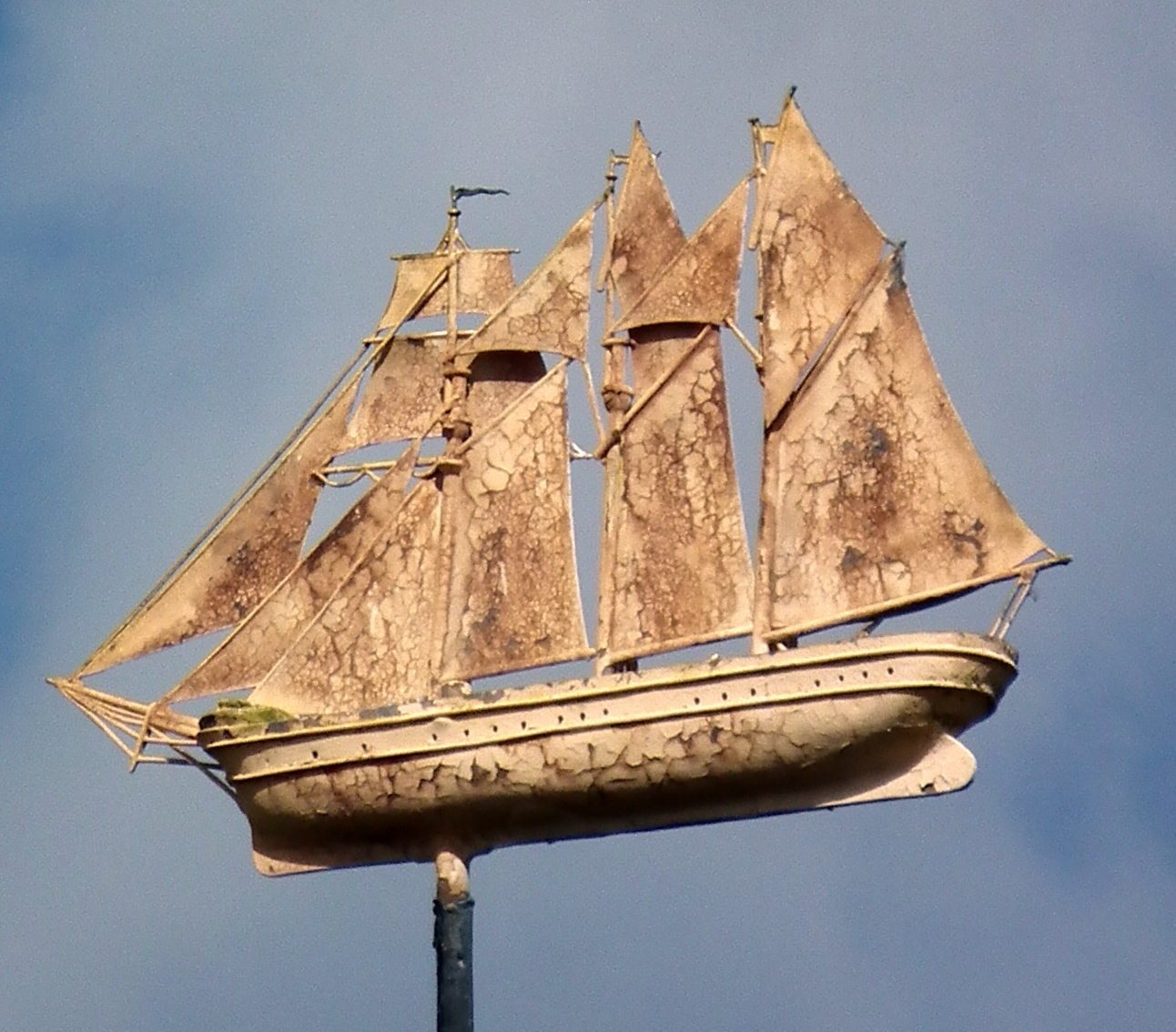
Lancashire Witch wind vane on Frank James Hospital, East Cowes, IoW

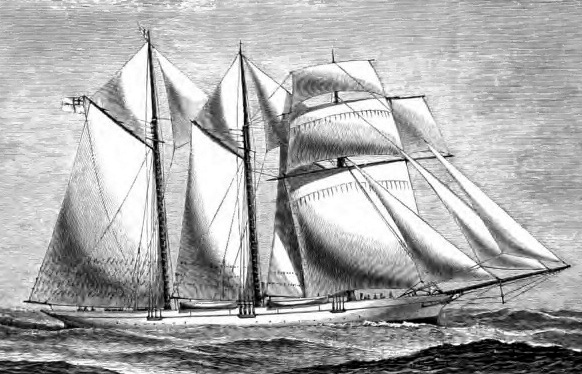
Lancashire Witch's "sister" Sunbeam under full sail.

== Career ==
=== Private yacht ===
In 1879 Sir Thomas Hesketh made a world cruise in Lancashire Witch, visiting Alaska in 1880. An island in Kachemac Bay, Cook Inlet was named after Sir Thomas and rocks were named Lancashire Rocks after the yacht.

There were a further three owners between 1883 and 1892 including Frank Linsly James, and on 17 March 1893 she was sold to the British Admiralty. She was renamed Waterwitch and rated as a sloop for survey work.

=== Royal Navy survey vessel ===
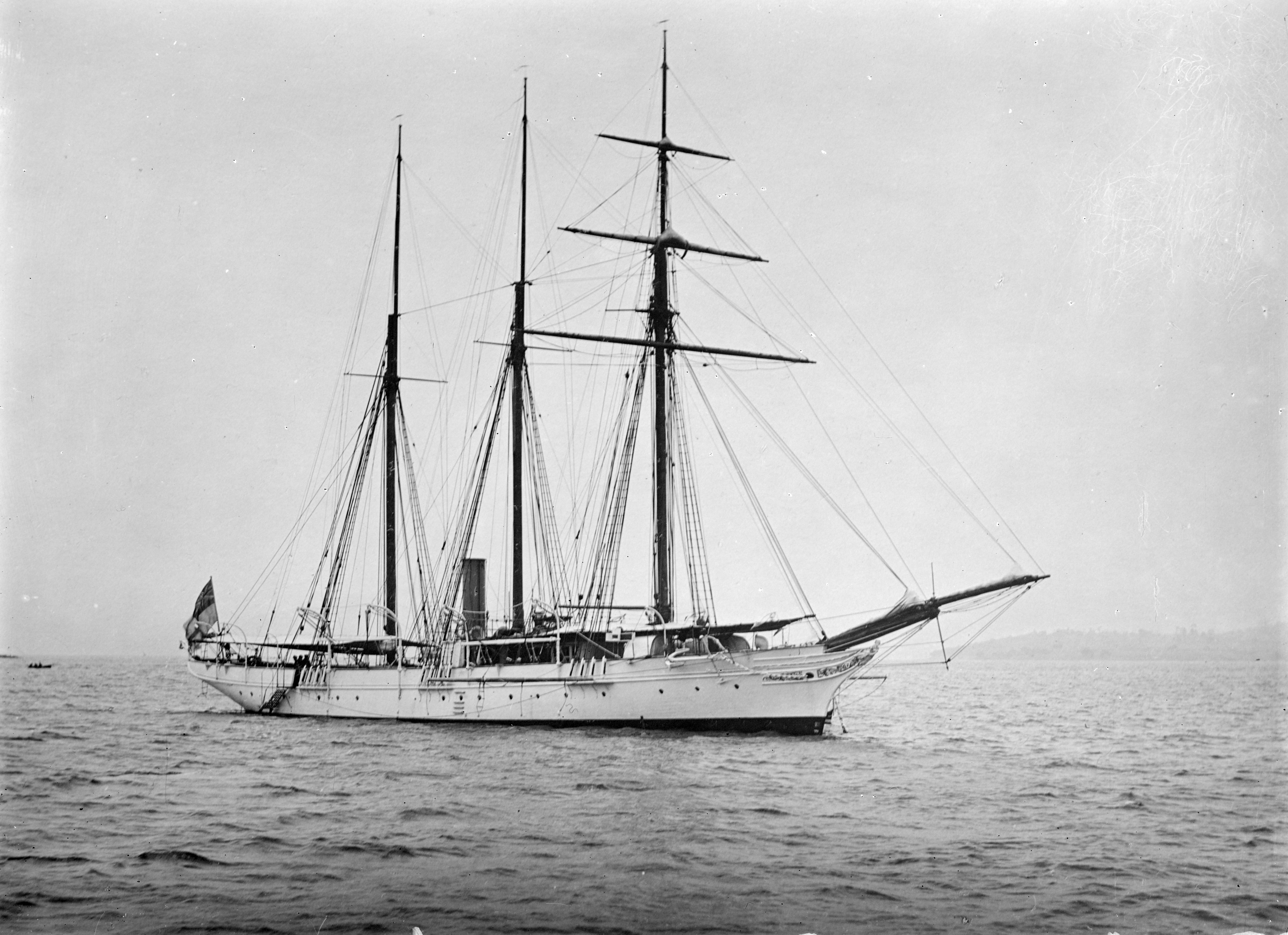
Waterwitch on the Australian Station, sometime after 1894

Waterwitch was converted for use as a survey vessel, which included replacing her engine and boilers to provide 450 horsepower. She commissioned in 1894 for service on the Australia Station, undertaking a series of surveys on passage to the Cape of Good Hope. Once on station she made lines of soundings in Esperance Bay, Fiji and the Tasman Peninsula in preparation for the running of telegraph cables. Between 1898 and 1907 she worked the coast of China, including Hong Kong, Weihaiwei and the Yangtze River. In early 1900 Commander Willoughby Pudsey Dawson was in command, succeeded by Lieutenant W. O. Lyne when she was re-commissioned on 16 February 1900. She formed part of the British naval contingent involved in relieving the Peking legations during the Boxer Rebellion in 1900 and surveyed the north channel of the Yangtze prior to the battleship Centurion's navigation of the river. In 1902 Lieutenant and Commander Ernest Clifford Hardy was in command, and she was in Hong Kong in October that year.

Socotra Rock was surveyed by Waterwitch confirming a depth of less than 18 ft (5.5 m), and she met severe gales in the Formosa Channel in 1903 and lost three men overboard. In 1906 she escaped being driven ashore in Chauan Bay by weighing anchor and steaming to safety in the calm of the storm-centre as it passed over. In 1908, under Lieutenant Percy Douglas, she surveyed around Singapore and Klang, with work in this area continuing under other commanding officers until her fatal accident in 1912.

== Loss ==
H.M.S. Waterwitch, the Admiralty survey ship … was sunk in the harbour yesterday in extraordinary circumstances. She was rammed amidships by the Colonial yacht Seamew, commanded by Captain Chamberlain, and went down before she could be beached at a convenient spot

— The Straits Times, 2 September 1912

Waterwitch awash at low water at Singapore, 1912

On 1 September 1912, while lying at anchor off the north-eastern end of the mole at Singapore Harbour, Waterwitch was struck amidships by Seamew, the personal launch of the Governor of Singapore. Seamew had been heading around the breakwater for her usual berth and paid little enough attention to the position of Waterwitch that she drove right at her. The launch's sharp prow pierced Waterwitch's wooden side, and she then compounded her error by putting her engines hard astern. Waterwitch's bridge collapsed, her mainmast fell over the port side, and the resulting gaping wound in her side allowed an overpowering in-rush of water.

Since her fires were out, no power could be raised, and so her anchor watch operated the pumps and a tug took her in tow. The wash from the tug increased the flooding and Waterwitch sank in 24 ft (7.3 m) of water. At low water, her masts, funnel, and the highest parts of her superstructure remained above water. Two members of her ship's company were drowned: Marine Sturgess knocked himself out diving overboard and was drowned, and an unnamed Chinese boy drowned between decks. A Board of Trade inquiry was held at Singapore from 20 to 23 September 1912 and found that the collision was due to the negligence of Seamew's captain and, to a lesser degree, her First Officer and Chief Engineer. At a re-opened inquiry the following month, the two subordinate officers were exonerated.

The wreck was raised on 10 September 1912 and taken to drydock at Tanjong Pagar. On 12 October 1912 Waterwitch was offered for sale "as lies" in drydock.

== Return to service ==
The purchaser of Waterwitch, local Italian businessman Captain Giovanni Gaggino, ordered her refit at Tanjong Pagar as a private yacht. Renamed Fata Morgana, the yacht departed Singapore for the South Seas in early January 1914. Captain Gaggino died at Batavia, Dutch East Indies in February 1918.

== Myth of the White Ladye ==
There are references indicating that HMS Waterwitch was formally White Ladye, at one time owned by actress Lillie Langtry. However, there is an audit trail from Lloyd's Yacht Register for the White Ladye showing that she was in private hands from the day she was built to when she was dismantled in 1935 and this is supported by contemporary newspaper articles.
