= Frank Linsly James =

British explorer (1851–1890)

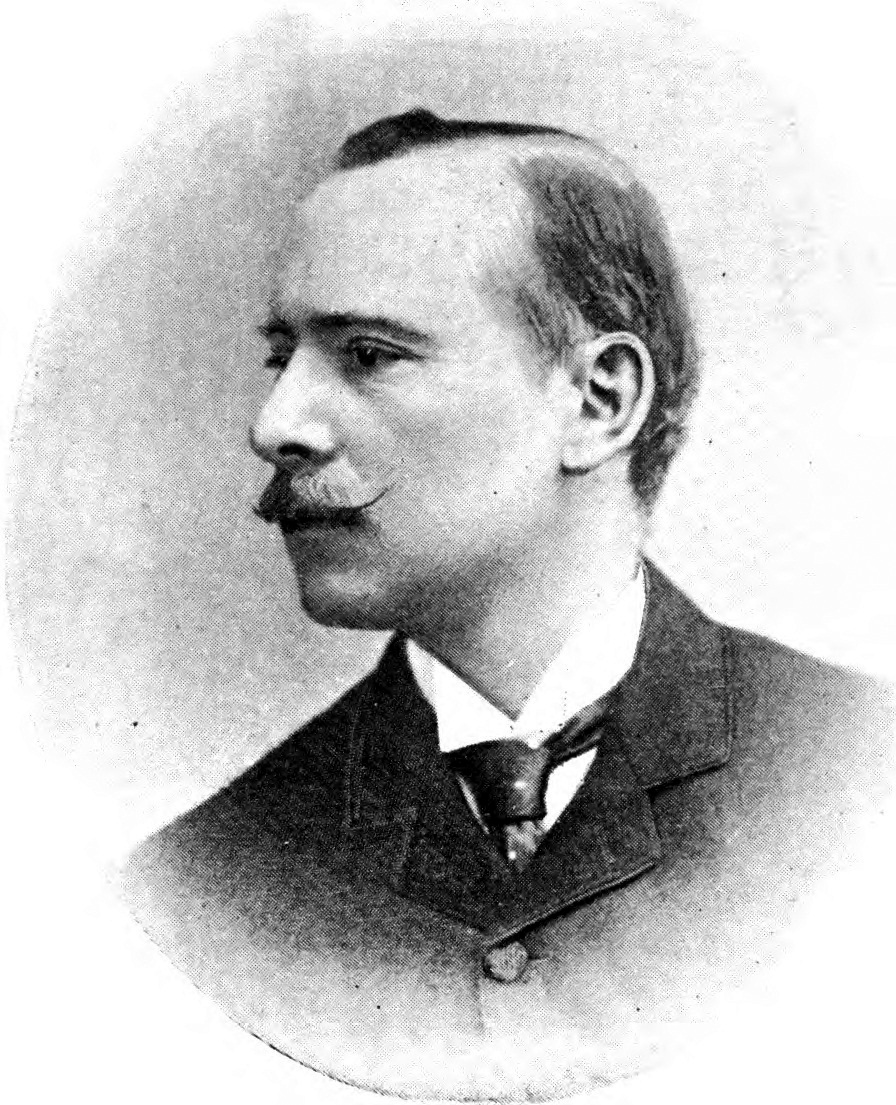
- Frontispiece from The Unknown Horn of Africa
- Born: 21 April 1851; Liverpool, england
- Died: 21 April 1890 (aged 39); Gabon
- Parent(s): Daniel James; Sophia Hall Hitchcock

Frank Linsly James FRGS (21 April 1851 – 21 April 1890) was an English explorer. He was the son of American parents: Liverpool-based merchant Daniel James and Sophia Hall (Hitchcock) James.

He was born and raised in Liverpool; the 1861 census shows him living at his parents' home of Oakwood House, Elmswood Road, Aigburth, Liverpool. The 1871 census shows him again living at his parents' home, but now at Beaconsfield House, Woolton, occupation "Under Graduate, Cambridge". In 1890 his home was 14 Great Stanhope Street in the county of Middlesex.

James explored in Sudan, Somaliland, India and Mexico often using his private yacht Lancashire Witch, often accompanied by one or both of his brothers – John Arthur James and William (Willie) Dodge James. After Frank's death Willie James used the Lancashire Witch for a period. The yacht was formerly owned by Sir Thomas Hesketh. In 1894 the Lancashire Witch was purchased by the Admiralty and became the survey vessel HMS Waterwitch.

Frank James wrote Wild Tribes of the Sudan (1883) and The Unknown Horn of Africa (1888). He was killed in Gabon, West Africa by a wounded elephant. He was buried in Kensal Green Cemetery, exhumed in 1917 and re-interred in the family plot at West Dean, West Sussex.

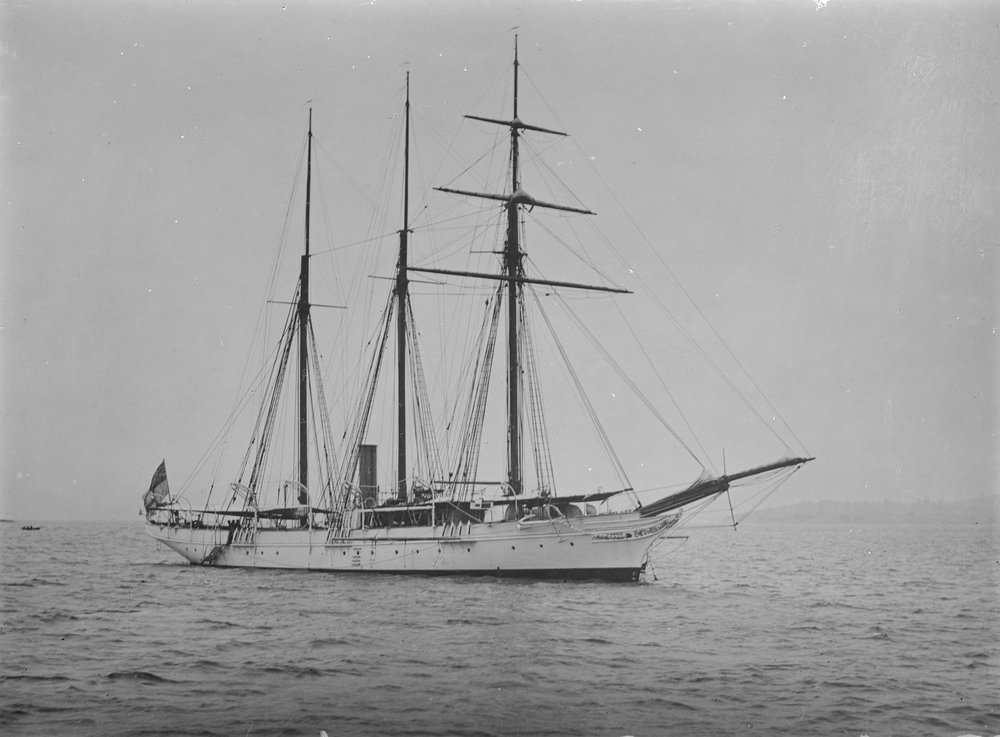
Lancashire Witch RYS, sold to Admiralty in 1893 and renamed l HMS Waterwitch

His writing was not without humour and in The Unknown Horn of Africa (p. 20), when seeking advice from British Agent Langton Prendergast Walsh on how best to procure camels and handlers for the expedition, he recalls: "Well, I felt I was nowhere and nohow. Berbera is hot place, and the superior physique of Mr. Walsh was beginning to tell; his energy and emphasis were oppressing without impressing me, and seemed to increase, as though he were receiving all I was losing. Another minute and I might have abandoned hope; but he paused for breath and Dualla shot in to the rescue". Obviously not amused, forty-two years later Walsh devoted a chapter in his book Under the Flag - and Somali Coast Stories to the James expedition. He considers that he had been "held up to obloquy for my actions and attitude towards the James party". He is critical of the way the expedition was organised, and writes that he had to intervene to prevent the party being "wiped out and looted".

Frank James is commemorated in the name of the three-streaked tchagra (Tchagra jamesi) and the Frank James Hospital, East Cowes, Isle of Wight.

Family of F. L. James

Elizabeth Woodbridge Phelps (1807-1847)				Daniel James (1801-1876)			Sophia Hall Hitchcock (1820-1870)
Anson Greene Phelps James (1830-1842)	Daniel Willis James (1832-1907) m.1854 Ellen Stebbins Curtiss (1833-1916)	Elizabeth Eggleston James (1833-1868)	Olivia James (1837-1935) m.1863 Robert Hoe III (1839-1909)	Henry James (1839-1839)	Frank Linsly James (1851-1890)	John Arthur James (1853-1917) m.1885 Mary Venetia Cavendish-Bentinick (1861-1948)	William Dodge James (1854-1912) m.1889 Evelyn Elizabeth Forbes (1867-1927)

Commemorative plaque St Andrew's Church; West Dean; West Sussex UK

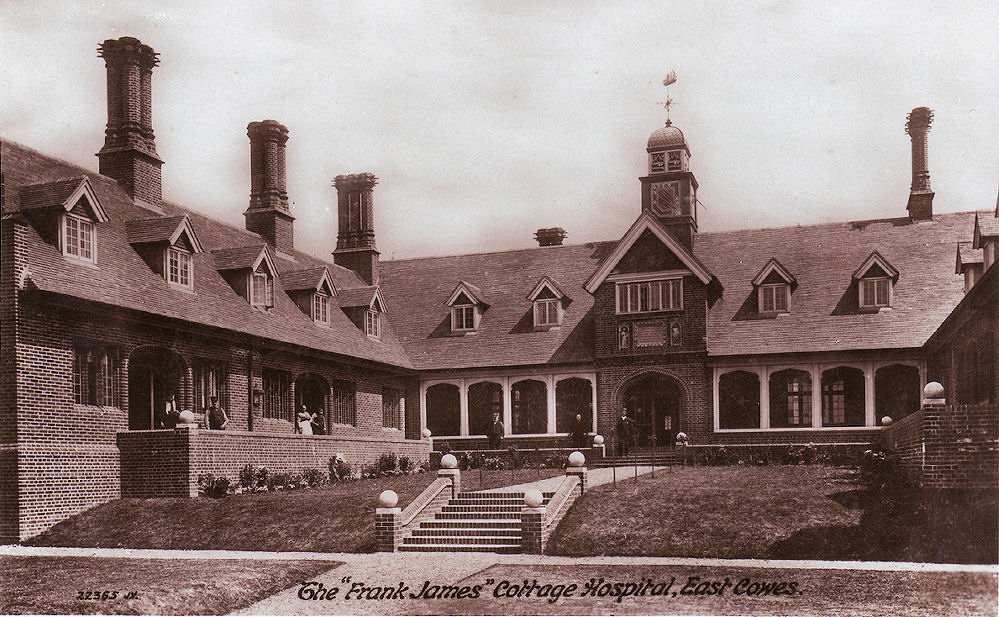
Frank James Hospital in 1903

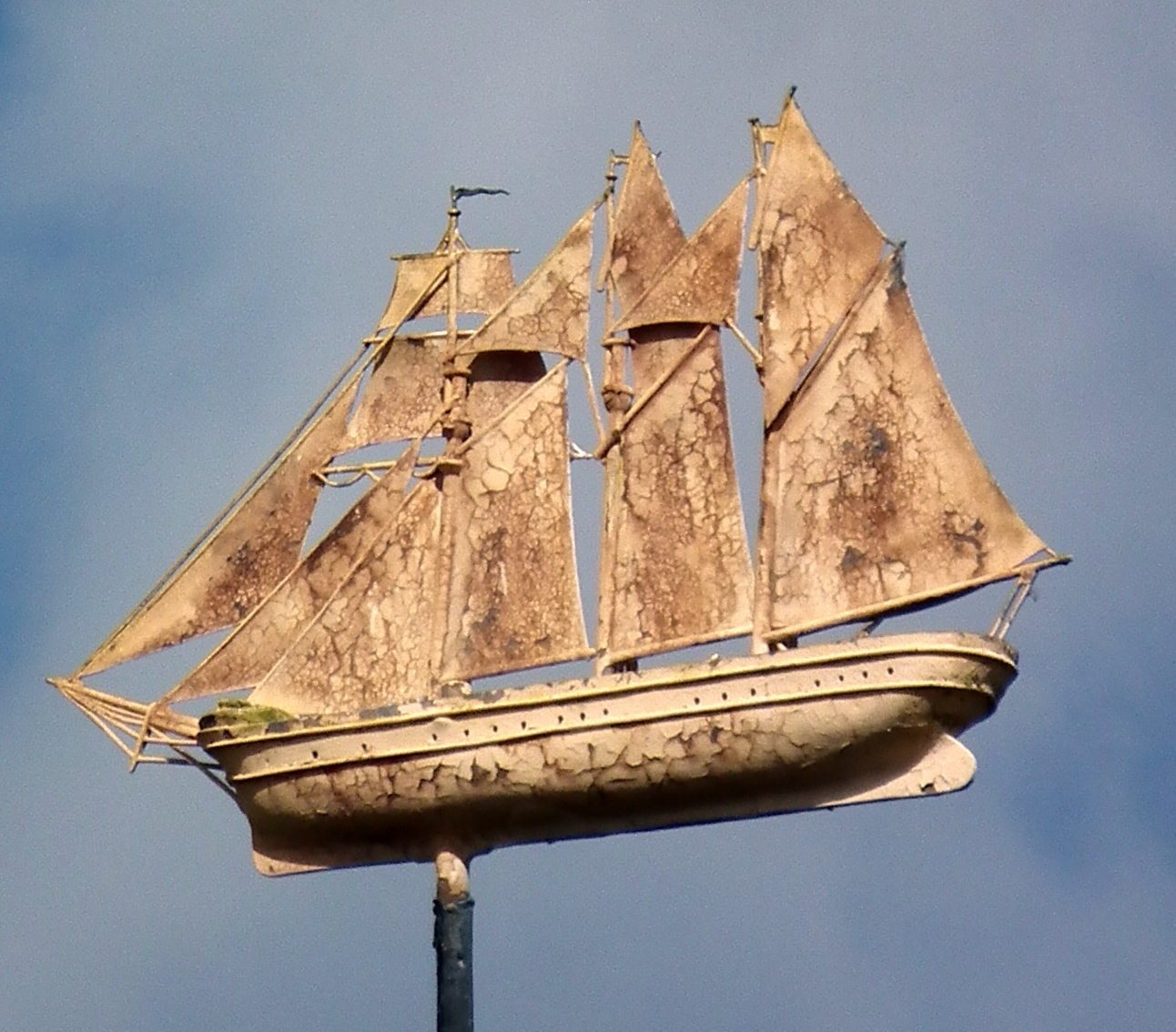
"Lancashire Witch" wind vane on Frank James Hospital, East Cowes, Isle of Wight

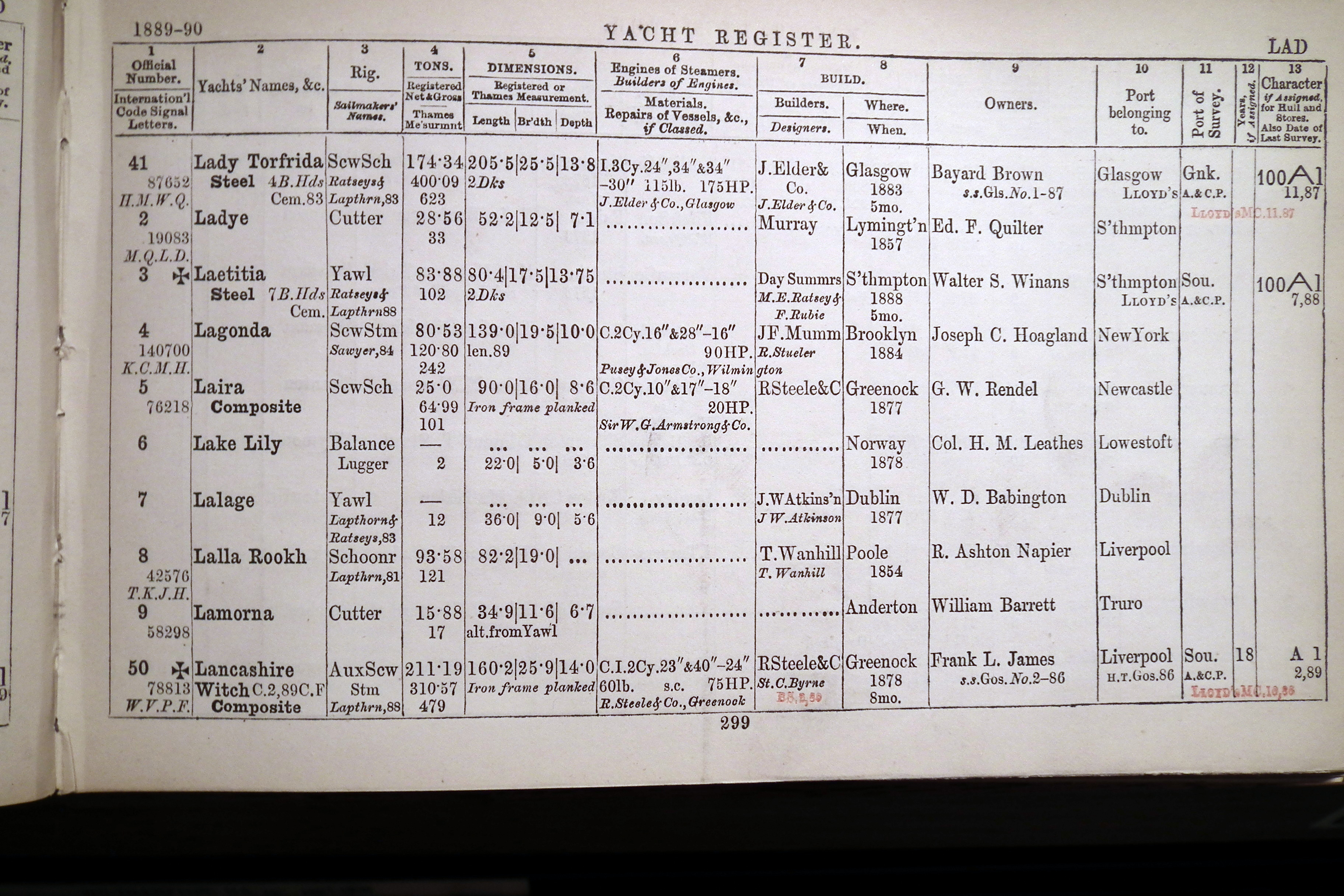
Lloyd's yacht register 1889–1890

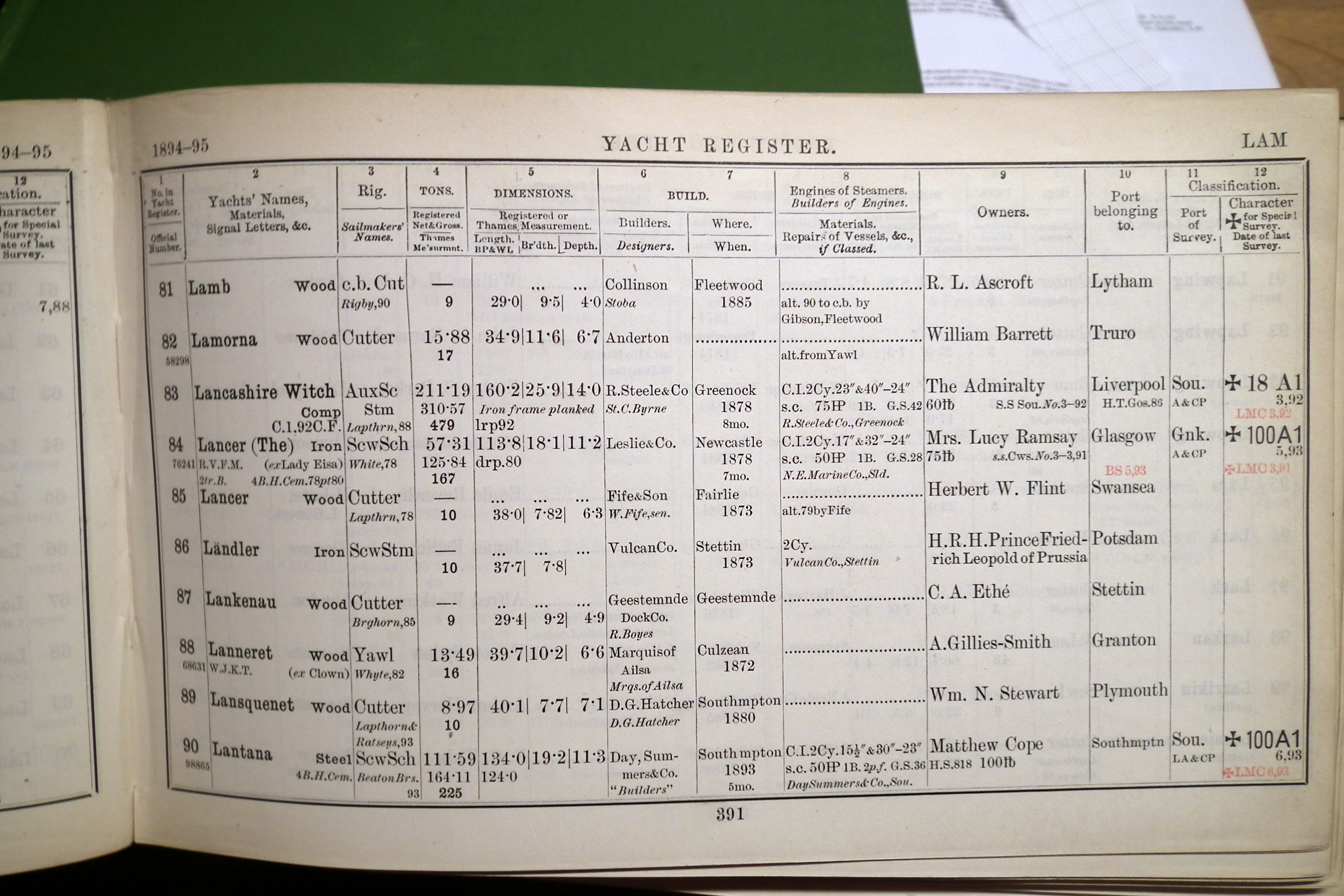
Lancashire Witch purchased by the Admiralty

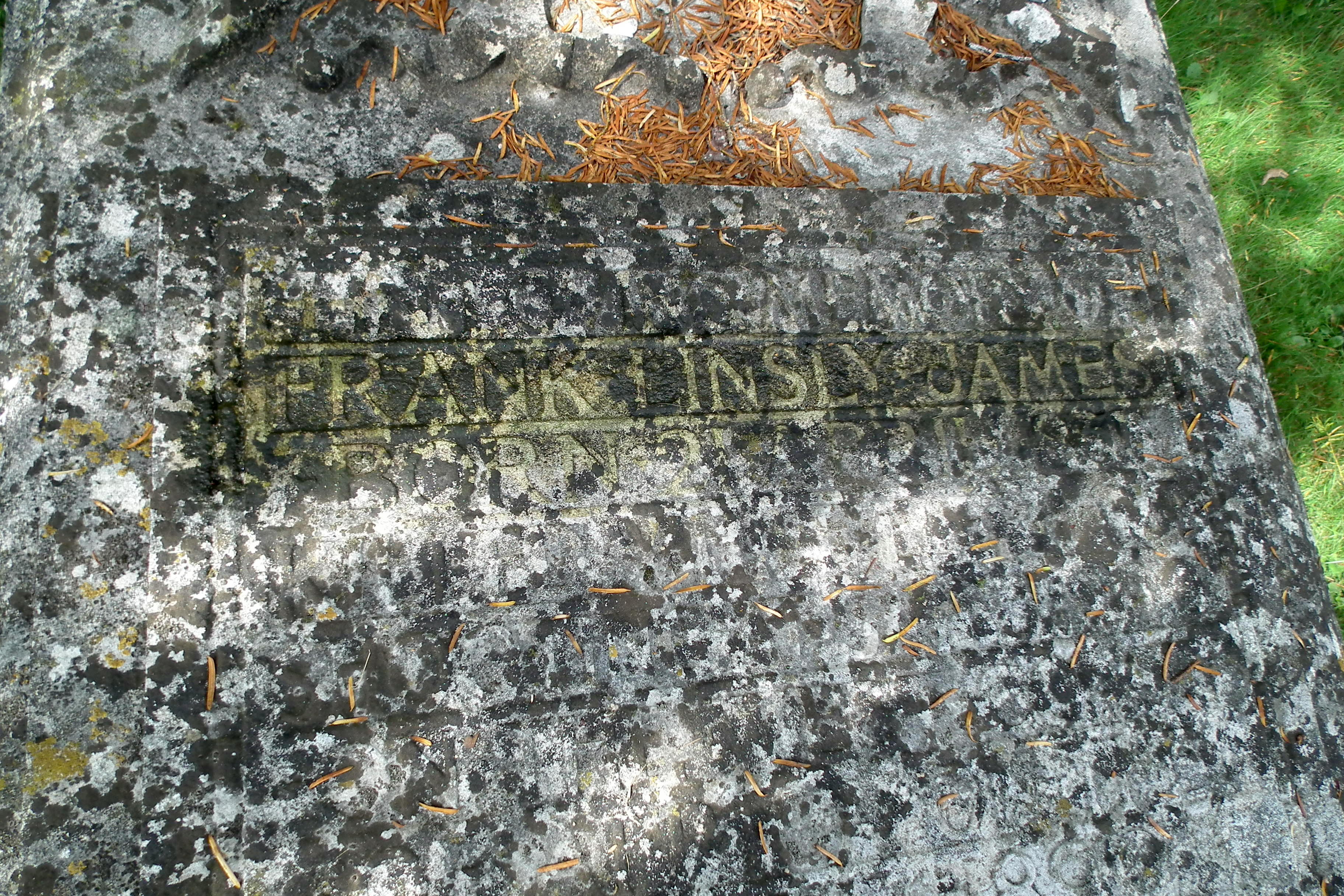
Grave in West Dean Cemetery. The remains of F L James moved from Kensal Green Cemetery in 1917.

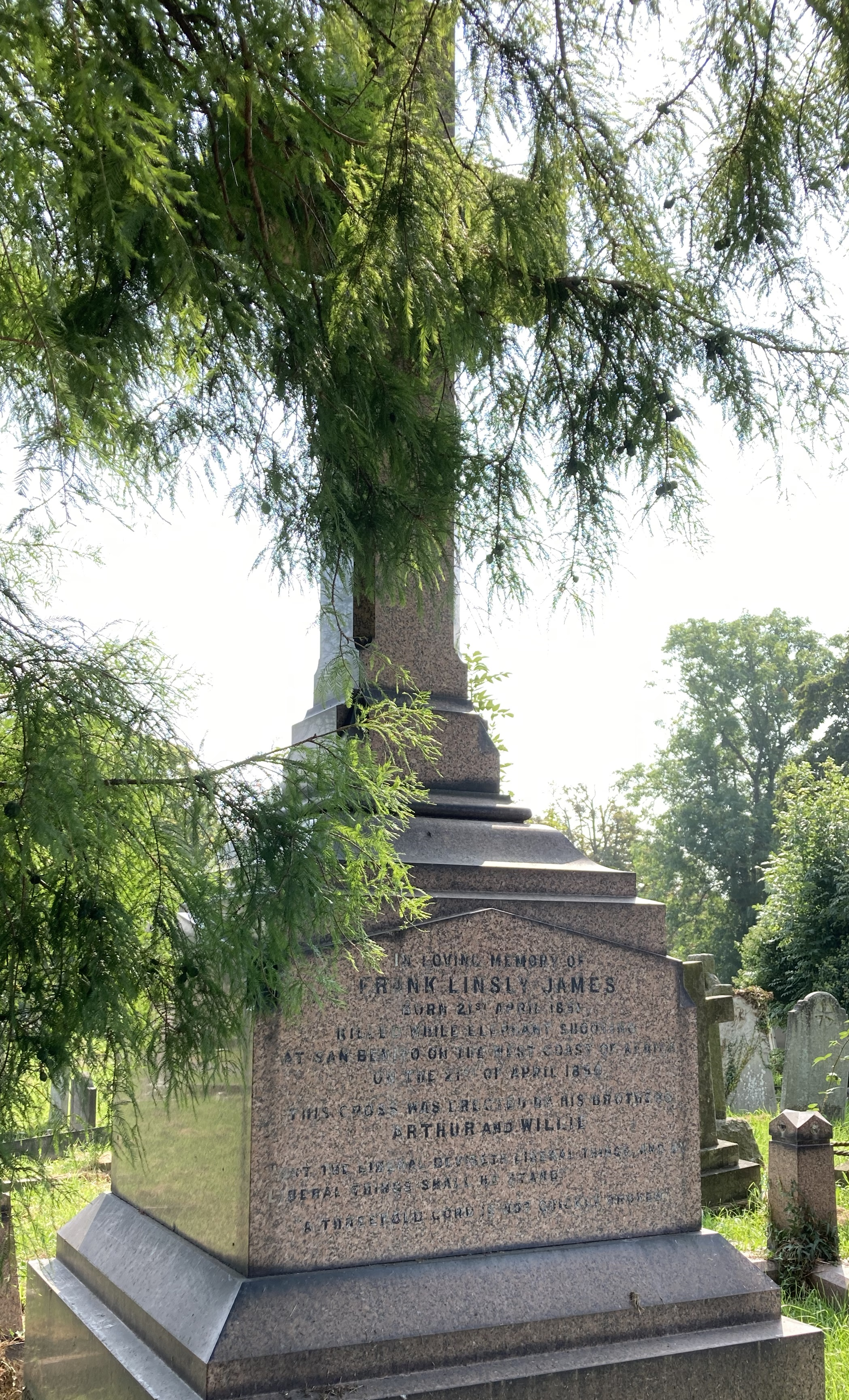
Memorial to Frank Linsly James in Kensal Green Cemetery
