= Mrs Willie James =

Evelyn James
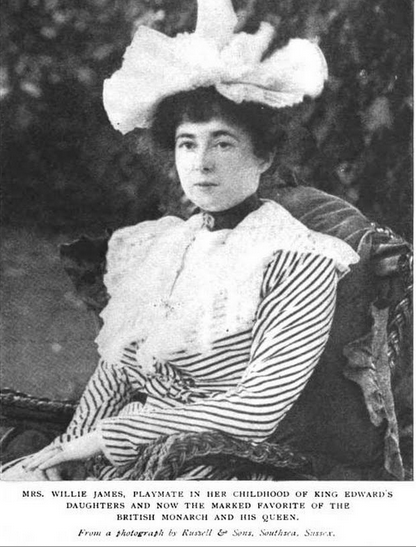
- Evelyn Forbes James, from a 1907 publication.
- Born: 1867
- Died: 13 May 1929 (aged 61–62)
- Spouse: William Dodge James
- Children: 5, including Edward James
- Parent(s): Sir Charles Forbes, 4th Baronet of Newe; Helen Moncreiffe

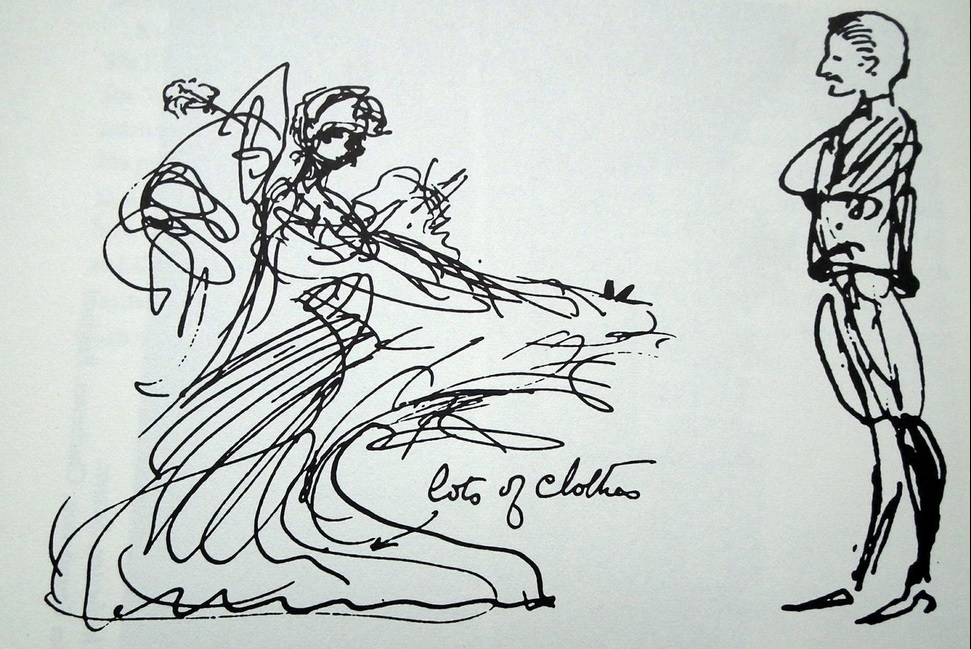
Mr and Mrs Willie James by Edwin Lutyens

Evelyn Elizabeth James CBE DStJ (née Forbes; 1867 – 13 May 1929), known as Mrs Willie James, was a Scottish socialite known in the late Victorian and Edwardian periods as the hostess of house parties and shooting weekends at the West Dean House country estate in Sussex. Frequent guests included Albert Edward, Prince of Wales, who acted as godfather to her son, Edward James.

== Biography ==
She was the eldest daughter of Helen Moncreiffe and Sir Charles Forbes, 4th Baronet of Newe. Their estate, Castle Newe, was adjacent to Balmoral Castle, the Scottish residence of Queen Victoria and Prince Albert. The two families knew each other and Evelyn became a friend to their son Edward, Prince of Wales (Edward VII).

In 1889 she married William Dodge James, who was the son of a wealthy merchant and they purchased West Dean House in the village of West Dean, West Sussex, England. She became known as Mrs Willie James and was one of the great hostesses of the period, often entertaining the Prince of Wales as a guest, and other notables including the King of Spain. She and Willie James had five children, four daughters and a son — Edward William Frank James, whose godfather was Edward VII. Her daughter Audrey Evelyn James Coats married American Marshall Field III.

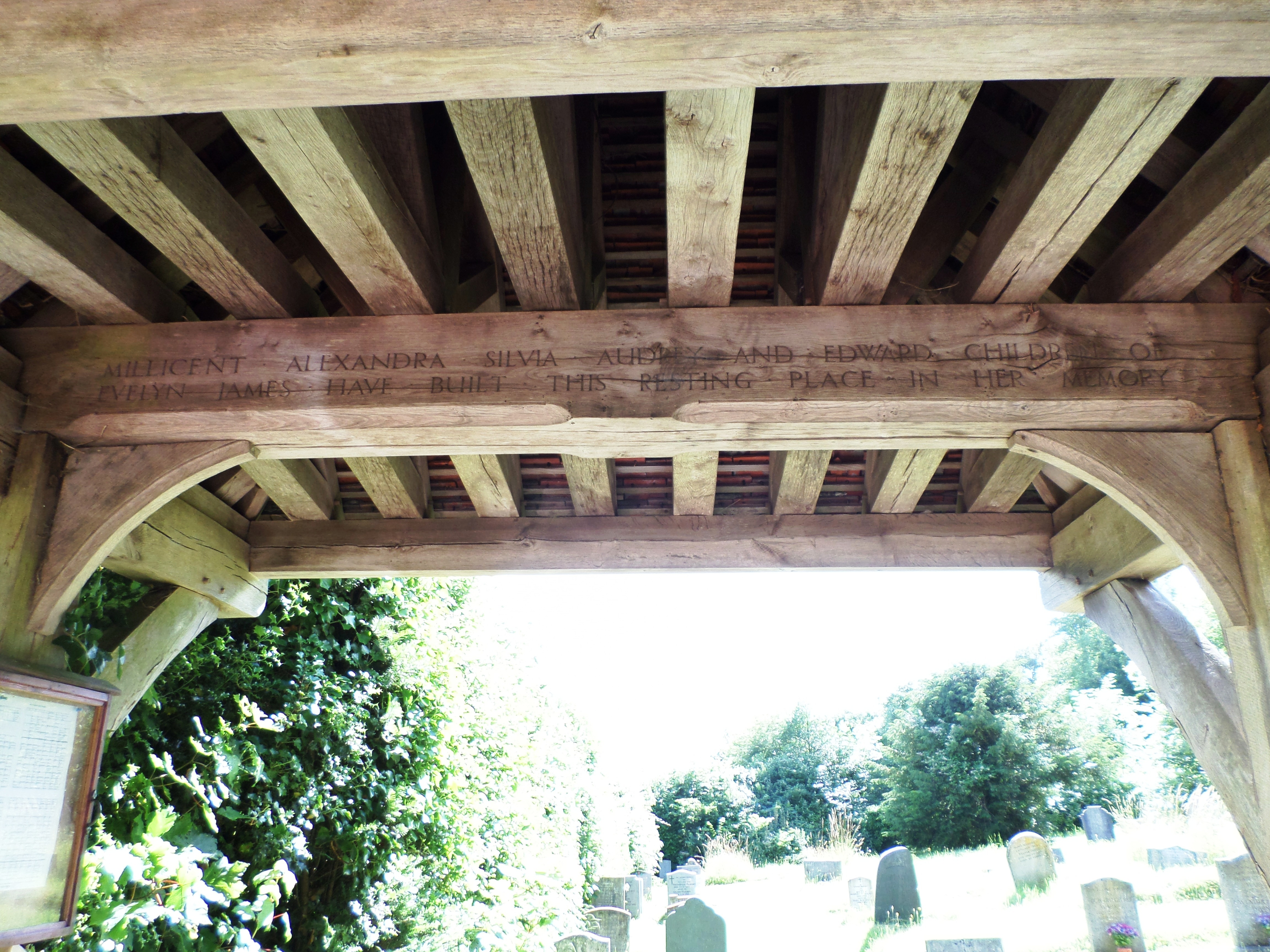
Wording reads: Millicent, Alexandra, Silvia, Audrey and Edward, children of Evelyn James have built this resting place in her memory

After the death of her husband in 1912, Evelyn married Major John Chaytor Brinton the following year; the marriage was annulled in 1927. In the 1922 New Year Honours, she was appointed a Commander of the Order of the British Empire for her role as chairman and founder of the Housing Association for Officers' Families and contributions to philanthropy.

Evelyn died in 1929 following major surgery and was buried in West Dean cemetery.
