= Norris Castle =

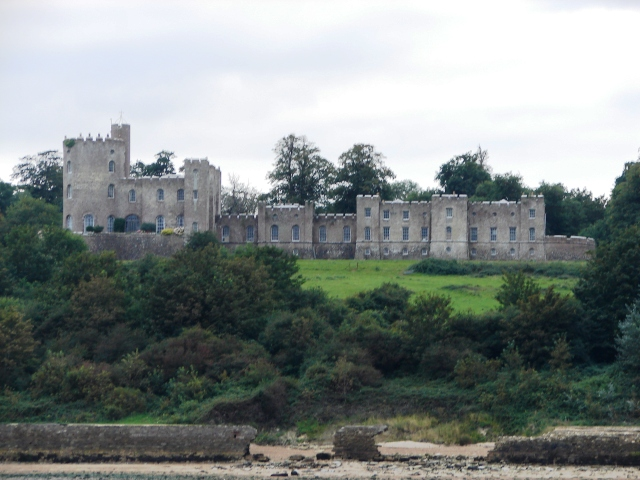
- Norris Castle from the sea

- Location within Isle of Wight

General information
- Architectural style: Norman/Georgian Style
- Location: Isle of Wight, East Cowes, United Kingdom
- Coordinates: 50.763056°N 1.270556°W
- Construction started: 1795
- Completed: 1805
- Client: Lord Henry Seymour

Design and construction
- Architect: James Wyatt

Norris Castle is located on the Isle of Wight. It was designed by James Wyatt for Lord Henry Seymour. The estate adjoins Osborne House, country home to Queen Victoria. On the other side of Norris Castle sits the Spring Hill estate, bought by William Goodrich in 1794. Norris Castle was built in 1799 and sits in 225 acres of land, with a mile of waterfront. The Castle is a Grade I listed building.

The parks and gardens at Norris Castle are the Isle of Wight's only Grade I landscape listed by Historic England. The landscape at Norris Castle is thought to have been designed in 1799 by Humphry Repton, and it includes a castellated walled garden.

Despite its grandeur, the castle's condition has long suffered due to lack of funding for its upkeep.

At the present time, the castle is closed to the public, awaiting restoration.

== Name ==
The name comes from the (le) Noreys family, taken from an estate called Norys (1519), Norres (1559), Norris (1611).

== Features ==
Norris Castle has a galleted facade with crenellations, but all of this is for show, as the castle has no defensive fortifications. The building's original function was as a residence. The main castle has 15 bedrooms, a grand hall, a circular drawing room and extensive cellars.

The estate includes a two-bedroom Lodge Cottage, four-bedroom Farmhouse, three-bedroom Farmhouse Cottage and a two-bedroom Landing House. James Wyatt also designed the farmyard buildings that are further inland, which have a similar design to the castle itself.

There are also extensive traditional farm buildings and stabling, a walled garden, a modern two-bedroom farm building and parkland and woodland.

== Owners ==
=== Lord Henry Seymour (1795–1830) ===
The first owner and builder of Norris Castle was the politician, Lord Henry Seymour, who bought the estate in 1795, at the age of 49. Having retired, he spent the rest of his life building and improving the Norris Castle estate. It is said that it cost £195,000 to originally build. He had a reputation for both eccentricity and benevolence. His personal habits were also said to be those of extreme simplicity and frugality.

Seymour commissioned stained glass from William Raphael Eginton. Circa 1816, Eginton described it as a "Heraldic Window in Saloon, on Mosaic Ground.".

There is an account of a visit by J and H Oldershaw to the island in 1826 and their reminiscences of Lord Seymour. They described him as an eccentric character and an old retired bachelor, who by all accounts had not left the island for 20 or 30 years. They said that his normal attire of blue jacket and trousers, together with hobnailed boots, made him look more like a labourer, for which he was frequently mistaken. He would often work in hedges and ditches with his men and would even go into town in his dung cart. He would also play jokes on his visitors by pretending to be a labourer, whilst showing them around the estate. He was even known to accept money from them, which he would give to his servants, saying "Here you are. I have got you something today!".

After completing his work on the estate, Lord Seymour opened the castle up to the public, to allow them to share its charm and magnificent views. After his death in 1830 at the age of 84, the castle remained closed to the public for over 140 years, when it was opened up again in 1975.

In August 1830, the Dauphiness and Duchess De Berri, accompanying the expatriated King of France, visited Norris Castle. The king had abdicated on 2 August and left France for England on 16 August, when it seemed that the royal party's safety was in jeopardy from angry mobs of French citizens. One of their first ports of call was Cowes and East Cowes. The Princesses were said to be charmed by the scenery of the island, although they complained of their 'stinted' lodgings at the Fountain Hotel. They did however, indicate that they would like to take up residence at Norris Castle.

=== Lord George Seymour (1830–1839) ===
Following the death of Lord Henry Seymour, the estate passed to his brother, Lord George Seymour, who was 67 at the time. George Seymour was a politician who represented Orford between 1784 and 1790 and Totnes between 1796 and 1801.

He kept the Castle for nine years, before selling it in 1839 to Robert Bell.

=== Mr Robert Bell (1839–1880) ===
Mr Robert Bell was a newspaper tycoon, who owned amongst others, the Weekly Dispatch, which he founded in 1801. In 1928 the newspaper was renamed to the Sunday Dispatch, which in turn was merged with the Sunday Express in 1961.

One of the accomplishments of Mr Bell, was that it was he who built the mile long sea wall, which both protects the estate's coastline and also gives a view of the castle. The cost of building the wall was said to be over £20,000.

In 1940, a pair of silver 7-light candelabra engraved with the inscription "Presented by Her Royal Highness the Duchess of Kent to Robert Bell, Esq., Norris Castle, 1859" was sold at Christie's for £40 11s. 6d.

Norris Castle was sold to the Duke of Bedford by Robert Bell in 1880.

=== The Duke and Duchess of Bedford (1880–1897) ===
In 1880, Elizabeth Russell, the Duchess of Bedford was appointed Mistress of the Robes to Queen Victoria. So that they could be near Osborne, her husband, Francis Russell, the Duke of Bedford bought Norris Castle in 1880.

In July 1887, the Frederick III, German Emperor and Victoria, Princess Royal, spent about a month in this castle. Princess Victoria was the eldest daughter of Queen Victoria. Prince Frederick was suffering from his throat problem and was under treatment of the famous British Laryngologist Morell Mackenzie and after an operation on 28 June 1887, Prince Fredrick came to stay in this castle for a rest and recovery. Later, the throat problem of Prince Frederick was proved to be a rare case of Laryngeal Cancer and he succumbed to his illness on 15 June 1888, just after 99 days of ruling as the German Emperor Kaiser Frederick III

In July 1890, Viscount Cantelupe and his bride spent their honeymoon at Norris Castle, as guests of the Duke and Duchess. The Viscount was killed at sea in 1915, whilst on active service during the First World War.

The Duke of Bedford died in 1891, at the age of 71, in Eaton Square, London. He committed suicide by shooting himself, when said to be in a state of temporary insanity, whilst suffering from pneumonia. The Duchess died in 1897, at the age of 78, in Latimer House, Buckinghamshire.

=== Lord Ampthill (1897–1903) ===
Following the death of the Duchess of Bedford, the estate was inherited by the late Duke of Bedford's nephew, the 28 year old Sir Arthur Oliver Villiers Russell GCSI GCIE JP DL, who was the 2nd Baron Ampthill. He immediately declared that he wished to sell the estate and the aging Queen Victoria again considered buying it. This of course never happened.

Lord Ampthill served as the Governor of Madras from October 1900 to February 1906 and acted as the Viceroy of India from April to December 1904.

In 1898, it was reported that a peacock belonging to Lord Ampthill had been shot and stolen from the Norris Castle estate.

In July 1899, it was reported that he let out Norris Castle for the summer to the eccentric Philadelphia millionaire A J Drexel, for the yachting season. At around the same time, Lord Ampthill put Norris Castle up for sale. Drexel was a frequent visitor to Cowes and berthed his 'palatial' steam yacht Margarita there for a long time. The Margarita was 323 feet in length, being at the time, the largest steam yacht built on the Clyde, Glasgow. She weighed over 1800 tons.

Whilst still awaiting sale, the castle was later occupied for a while by Lady Dudley and also by Captain John Orr-Ewing and his wife Ellen Clarissa Kennard. John, a captain in the 4th Dragoon Guards and a noted yachtsman, was the son of Sir Archibald Orr-Ewing Ellen was a noted singer, who 'gracefully performed' the opening ceremony of an Egyptian themed fund raising event at Victoria Hall, Cowes, in 1902. She was accompanied by their five year old daughter Jean.

In January 1903, it was reported that Lord Ampthill had sold the castle to a syndicate, although it was said that Captain and Mrs Orr-Ewing would be staying on for a time. This was proved to be the case, as in March 1903, the Orr-Ewings hosted what was thought to be the first fox hunt held at Norris castle. The hunt covered a lot of ground, as they chased a fox from Whippingham Station to Staplers.

=== The 'Syndicate' (1903–1908) ===
At the time of the sale, it was reported that Lord Ampthill was probably wise to sell the castle at that time, as it was indicated that Norris Castle had started to fall into a state of disrepair. It was predicted that over the next few years there would be rapid development of the estate, by the building company that had taken over ownership.

In March 1904, there was an extensive burglary at Norris Castle, at a time when Captain Orr-Ewing was away from home. Mrs Orr-Ewing was awakened in the early hours of the morning by hearing a noise downstairs. On going downstairs, she discovered that the house had been burgled, but the perpetrators had already fled the scene. Entry had been gained by breaking ground-floor windows and articles of considerable value had been taken. These included Captain Orr-Ewing's silver yachting trophies inscribed with Nyama (the name of his yacht), two hammerless guns in a leather case, inscribed with the monogram "Sir W Orr-Ewing", silver boxes, a gilt clock and articles of clothing. A week later, many of the stolen articles were recovered when they were found abandoned in the estate's grounds. The Orr-Ewing's moved out of Norris Castle shortly after.

In July 1904, it was reported that the castle was occupied for a time by the American businessman John Morgan Richards and his wife. Their daughter, Pearl Mary Craigie, was a famous novelist, who wrote under the pseudonym John Oliver Hobbes. By 1906, when their daughter died suddenly of heart failure at the age of 39, they were living at Steephill, Isle of Wight.

That same month, Norris Castle was put up for sale again, by auction. The estate was described as a "grand opportunity for development into a seaside resort with practically every house overlooking the world-renowned yacht anchorage and Solent, through which the shipping of the world passes." However, the castle failed to sell and was withdrawn from the auction when the bidding only reached £38,000.

In February 1906, it was proposed that the Norris Castle estate be turned into a golf club, to rival any in the world. It was thought that there was much to commend a venture that would bring both the yachting world and golfing world together at Cowes; and that the course would be particularly attractive to those that sail. It was said that having no golf course in Cowes, was a serious handicap for any fashionable seaside resort. It was proposed that Norris Castle itself be used as a 'Dormy house' for the club. The famous golfer, James Paxton, had already designed a 5700-yard, eighteen-hole course, which could be extended, if needed. It was suggested that there would be a landing stage for yachtsmen and even perhaps a large pier to take railway steamers. History shows that the club was never built at Norris Castle, However, since 1892, there had been a two-hole course at the nearby Osborne House estate, which was enlarged to nine holes in 1904.

In July 1907, it was stated that Norris Castle had been unoccupied for several years and that it was doubted that it was in a state capable of occupation. At that time, it was also described as 'empty and dismantled'.

Norris Castle was put up for auction again in August 1907, but was withdrawn from sale when the bidding only reached £28,000.

=== Messrs Alfred and Benjamin Densham (1908–1909) ===
It is likely that the Densham family only owned the castle for a short time around 1908/09. They were the brothers Alfred and Benjamin Densham, together with Alfred's eldest son Leigh.

Alfred Densham was of Bourton Hall, Totnes and Benjamin Densham was of Bramley Croft, Hindhead, which was said to be a 'splendid house'. They were two of the proprietors of the Mazawattee Tea Company, which was one of the most important and most advertised tea firms in England during the late 19th century. It was stated that in February 1909, an application was to be put before the Newport licensing authorities for an alcohol licence for Norris Castle, which was to be converted into a residential hotel. At one time, there were also rumours that the estate was to be developed for housing.

However, in August 1909, it was indicated that Leigh Densham had taken over ownership of the castle. Leigh was Alfred Densham's eldest son, who was obviously a man of many talents. He was a keen yachtsman, who often competed at Cowes. Leigh Densham was at one time in partnership with Charles Sibbick, of Thetis Road, Cowes, Isle of Wight, in the business Charles Sibbick & Co, yacht designers and builders. However, the partnership was dissolved in 1899. In 1901, Captain John Orr-Ewing had a 36-foot yacht, named simply 'D', built for him by Charles Sibbick.

Leigh Densham was also involved in many amateur dramatic productions, often in a leading role. In 1895, he appeared in the title role at the Theatre Royal, Bournemouth, in an amateur production by a company under his own stage management. A keen horseman and fox hunter, he was at one time Master of the Ashburton Harriers, which hunted in Dartmouth. He also went on to be master of the Dart Vale Harriers. In October 1902, he fell from his horse whilst jumping hurdles when out hunting. His horse rolled over him, leaving him with a broken collar bone.

In August 1909, the grounds of Norris Castle were opened up for the public to view a grand Naval Review. It was said that for this much appreciated concession, the public were indebted to Mr Leigh Densham, the owner of the fine old mansion and grounds.

Leigh Densham ultimately sold the castle in October 1909.

=== Sir Horatio Davies K.C.M.G, MP (1909–1912) ===
Lieutenant Colonel Sir Horatio David Davies KCMG, MP bought Norris Castle in October 1909, at the age of 61. He was an Alderman of the city of London, became the Sheriff of London and Middlesex in 1887 and Lord Mayor of London in 1897. He was also a former owner of Crosby Hall.

Shortly after buying Norris, Davies held a grand auction in the castle, selling a lot of its contents, which came to some 500 lots. This included furniture used by Queen Victoria when she resided at the castle before her marriage. An antique shaped fire-screen with gilded frame and needlework panel, worked on by the Queen when she was a girl, sold for £5 15s. A full-size billiard table was also sold for £32.

Sir Horatio Davies died only three years after purchasing the castle, in 1912.

=== Sir Richard Burbidge (1914–1917) ===
Following the death of Horatio Davies, the estate was then bought by the 65 year old Sir Richard Burbidge, who had also recently bought the adjoining Osborne Cottage from Princess Henry of Battenberg, youngest child of Queen Victoria. Burbidge said that he would continue to live in Osborne Cottage, but intended to let out the castle. In 1915, he was sworn in as a Justice of the peace at the London Sessions. He went on to become 1st Baronet of Littleton Park.

Burbidge was the managing director of Harrods at the time. By 1916, he had increased its profits from £16,000 to £200,000 per year.

Following the outbreak of the First World War, the estate was used to billet Canadian troops and their horses. Most of the men were encamped in tents, except for a few officers who had quarters in the castle itself. It is said that there are some unusual yellow daisies in the Norris fields, which are supposed to have come from seeds from the imported Canadian hay.

Sir Richard died in 1917.

=== Major Arthur Birkbeck (1917–1955) ===
The estate passed to Major Arthur Birkbeck, who held the castle until his death in 1945. His wife, Florence, then retained Norris Castle until her death in 1955. Arthur Birkbeck was a major in the 2nd South Midland Brigade, Royal Field Artillery. He resigned his commission and was granted permission to retain his rank and to wear the prescribed uniform in 1911.

In 1926, four men were charged at the County Petty Sessions with causing damage to growing daffodils at Norris Castle, by picking them. However, the benevolent Major Birkbeck said that he forgave them and wanted to withdraw the summons. He also very generously gave them jobs at the castle. The Chairman of the Bench discharged the defendants, saying that he had brought the case as a deterrent to others and said that any future case would have to be dealt with severely.

A similar case arose in 1927, when three men were charged with causing willful damage to growing grass, by treading it down. They said that they did not believe that they were doing damage, as they were following a path. They were each fined 2s. 6d., and ordered to pay 8d. damages.

In November 1927, Major Birkbeck applied for a slaughter-house license at the castle. Although the estate grounds proved to be satisfactory, the application was deferred to a later date.

In 1932, Major Birkbeck presented to the Cowes and East Cowes Councils a proposal to build an 'opening bridge' over the River Medina, on or near the site of the Chain Ferry. The scheme, which was estimated to cost around £35,000, was rejected by the Harbour Commissioners on the grounds that it would cause a probable obstruction to navigation.

During the Second World War, the castle was used as a barracks for army troops.

In 1947, there was a daring robbery at Norris Castle, in which the elderly Florence Birkbeck suffered a fractured jaw when she was brutally coshed on the head by one of possibly three robbers. She was alone in the house during the evening, with her sister Mary Elizabeth Law. The robbers wore masks and forced their way into the castle saying "This is a hold up", demanding money and jewellery. They had already cut the castle's telephone lines. Mrs Law was in her bathroom, washing her hair, but the robbers dragged her by her hair downstairs to join Mrs Birkbeck. A scuffle then took place, which resulted in Mrs Birkbeck being coshed. The robbers then took three valuable rings from Mrs Blrkbeck's fingers and from two safes, they took about £100 and more jewellery. They were then interrupted by the arrival of Mr C Cassell, the estate bailiff and made their escape, but left behind in their hurry, a dark brown trilby hat, bearing a London maker's name. One had a southern accent and the other a Cockney accent. Due to her injury, Mrs Birkbeck had to remain in the Frank James Hospital for some time afterwards.

Following the death of Mrs Birkbeck, an auction was held at the castle in July 1955, for the whole of their furniture and effects. At the same time, the castle itself was put up for sale, either for private sale or for auction at a later date. In due course, the castle went to auction in September 1955. The advertisement stated that if the estate didn't sell as a whole, then it would be offered as a number of lots. These included Norris Castle and 34 acres, Norris Castle Farm and 102 acres, Norris Castle Wood and 50 acres, Queen Victoria's Tea House, The Lodges, Four Cottages, New Barn Lodge, some work-shops, the gravel pit and some enclosures suitable for residences.

On 5 November 1955, it was announced that the Norris Castle estate had been sold to an 'Island lady' who at the time, did not want her identity disclosed.

=== Mrs Catherine Annie Briscoe George (1955–1961) ===
In fact, in May 1956, it was reported that the estate had indeed been broken up and sold as nineteen separate lots. It was also announced that planning permission had already been granted for Norris Castle itself to be converted into a hotel, although there was some doubt whether the plan would be pursued. Following the sale, Norris Castle was reduced from its original 228 acres to occupying only 34 acres. It later became apparent that the new owner was Mrs Catherine Annie Briscoe George.

When she bought the castle, it was in a very poor state of repair, following its wartime army occupation. However, Mrs Briscoe George, and later her daughter, worked tirelessly to restore the castle.

She was the widow of Albert Joseph George and the younger daughter of John Jonathan Briscoe and Agnes Ralph Briscoe. Catherine's elder daughter, Veronica, married Viscount Selby in 1933. Catherine Briscoe George also owned a number of other properties, including Blackburne House, Mayfair and Bridge House, Starbotton, Yorkshire.

Mrs Briscoe George died in March 1963, at the age of 85.

=== Mrs Joan Denyer Lacon, later Coventry (1961–2016) ===
In March 1961, the Norris Castle estate passed to Mrs Briscoe George's daughter, Joan Lacon and her husband, Commander Reginald Lacon, RN (retired). He fought in the Second World War, and he was mentioned in dispatches four times. He gained the rank of Commander and was decorated with the award of the Distinguished Service Cross (D.S.C.) and bar in 1941.

Within a week of taking over ownership, there was a great fire at the castle, which completely burnt out one of the bedrooms. Seven other downstairs rooms were damaged by the heat and the smoke. The damage was put at around £2,000. Firemen were called out at 9.30 a.m. and used breathing apparatus, because of the dense smoke. The castle had been unoccupied at the time and the fire was discovered when Mrs Lacon arrived to take up residence there.

In 1975, the Lacons opened the castle to the public for the first time in over 140 years. The reason for this was to help pay for the huge cost of keeping Norris Castle maintained. By this time, the Commander and Mrs Lacon also managed to reunite the castle with its original lands, sold off as nineteen separate lots, when it was auctioned in 1955. This brought the size of the estate back to 225 acres. The Lacons put in a huge amount of work into the estate, saying that "What the public will see, represents years and years of self-sacrifice. We do it because we love the place. We have had a lot of fun doing it, but we have done it on a shoestring". The public opening ceremony was conducted by jockey and best-selling author Dick Francis.

Work that still needed doing by that time was that the building's original and extensive roof needed renewing, the lengthy potholed driveway needed resurfacing, the mile-long crumbling sea wall needed renewing, the massive complex of farm and stable buildings needed restoration and an extensive tree-planting programme was required, to offset the ravages of beech and Dutch elm disease.

The Commander and Mrs Lacon were divorced in 1976 and Mrs Lacon went on to marry Major Digby Coventry in 1991. He also fought in the Second World War and was also mentioned in dispatches. He gained the rank of Major in the Royal Artillery and was decorated with the award of the Belgian Croix de Guerre, avec palme. He was also decorated with the award of the Chevalier, Order of Leopold of Belgium, with palm.

When Joan Coventry died in 2006, Major Coventry continued to occupy the castle until his death in September 2014.

=== Norris Castle Estate (Group) Ltd (2016 – ) ===
In February 2016, Norris Castle was bought for £4.7 million, with the intention that it be renovated and opened as a luxury hotel. The owning company is Norris Castle Estate (Group) Ltd. The selling agent set a guide price of £1 million, with the proviso that the estate would need millions spent to restore it. After the refusal of planning permission for redevelopment by Isle of Wight Council, the estate was put up for sale in June 2025.

== History ==
=== Etymology ===
The name 'Norris' is derived from the name of an early landowner, named Richard Le Norey, who held the estate during the reign of King Edward I. But the story of Norris Castle really originates centuries later in 1795, when the Norris farmland was bought by Lord Henry Seymour. Shortly afterwards, he commissioned James Wyatt to build him a new residence there. Wyatt designed and built the house in the style of a castle between 1795 and 1805, using locally mined stone. In the 200 years since it was built, the building remains virtually unaltered.

=== Visiting royalty ===
The prince regent and First Gentleman of Europe, later King George IV visited the castle in 1819 as the guest of Lord Henry Seymour. The king was on the island to make use of his yacht. Lord Seymour's personal habits were said to be those of extreme simplicity and frugality, but he never-the-less held a banquet for the king which was said to be 'splendid in the extreme and attended with circumstances of unusual conviviality'.

In August 1831, the Duchess of Kent, with her 12-year-old daughter the Heiress Presumptive Princess Victoria, who indeed went on to become the future Queen Victoria, also resided at the castle for quite some time. The young princess was said to have been able to live a life of unaccustomed freedom, walking her dog and riding her pony. She was also said to frequently enjoy country rambles and listening to the stories of the sailors and the coastguardsmen, as she lingered about the shore.

On their arrival to the island, the royals were welcomed with great ceremony in Newport. A huge flag, entirely made of lace, was suspended from the Newport Toll-gate, with the words "Welcome, welcome to our Isle." The flag was made at Broadlands House, the Newport lace factory; and the Broadlands House band was also there playing music amongst the cheering crowds. A grand reception was later held in Newport Town Hall, where the royals were welcomed by the Mayor, Alderman and Chief Burgesses of Newport. Afterwards, they were due to visit the nearby Carisbrooke Castle, but due to rain, they returned to Norris Castle.

The two royals also visited Norris Castle again in 1833. The old copper bath that Queen Victoria used as a child is still there, although for quite some time in the 1970s it was out in the courtyard, being used as a rainwater butt.

Queen Victoria visited the castle yet again in 1843, as a guest of Robert Bell, accompanied by her husband, Prince Albert. The royal couple disembarked, quite unexpectedly, from the Royal Barge captained by Lord Adolphus FitzClarence at the Coastguard Station, East Cowes. They then were shown into a carriage and taken to her 'favourite Norris Castle', where she went straight to her former apartments and joyously told the Prince Consort that "this was my room, and this was mine also".

Not long afterwards, in 1844, Queen Victoria tried to buy the property from the then owner, Robert Bell, who was a newspaper tycoon. However, she baulked at his asking-price and bought the nearby Osborne House estate instead. However, Queen Victoria went on to become a frequent visitor to Norris Castle, particularly after 1880, when it was under the ownership of the Duchess of Bedford, her Mistress of the Robes. She would always delight in remembering her earlier visits as a child. In 1845, Queen Victoria used the castle as lodgings for William II the King of the Netherlands.

In 1881, The Duke and Duchess of Bedford lent Norris Castle to Prince Christian of Schleswig-Holstein, the Danish-born German Prince; and his wife, Princess Helena of the United Kingdom. She was the fifth child of Queen Victoria.

In June 1903, Princess Henry of Battenberg took lunch with Captain and Mrs Orr-Ewing at Norris Castle, before opening the new Frank James Memorial Hospital at East Cowes.

The German Kaiser Wilhelm II and his wife Augusta Victoria of Schleswig-Holstein were also frequent visitors. So much so that Wilhelm had his own shower bath installed, which still remains today. The German Emperor Frederick III and his wife, the Empress were also frequent guests. The Empress was Queen Victoria's eldest child.

In August 1935, Her Majesty Queen Mary visited Norris Castle, whilst her husband, King George V was 'deriving the maximum pleasure from his favourite sport of racing on the Britannia'. Queen Mary was received by Major and Mrs Birkbeck and shown around the castle. She inspected the rooms previously used by the late Queen Victoria and the ex-Emperor of Germany and was deeply interested in the many improvements that Major Birkbeck had made to the castle. She also walked through the beautiful gardens.

=== The Great Fire ===
In 1889, there was a 'great fire' at Norris Castle. The superintendent of the Cowes Fire Brigade said that it was the most serious fire that they had had to contend with for some years. He also said that there was some additional interest and honour lent to the occasion, as royalty were present for some considerable time watching the brigade at work. The bill that was presented by the Fire Brigade for attending the fire was put at £48 18s 6d.

=== TV appearances ===
Norris Castle was used extensively in the filming of Doctor Who and the Sea Devils in October 1971. In those episodes, The Doctor was played by Jon Pertwee, with Katy Manning playing his companion Jo. The episodes featured other Isle of Wight locations as well, including No Man's Land Fort.
