= William Goodrich =

William Goodrich may refer to:

- William Goodrich, film director pseudonym used by Roscoe Arbuckle
- William Goodrich (died 1812), privateer, son of John Goodrich
- William M. Goodrich (1777–1833), American organ builder
