= William Shedden =

William Shedden may refer to:

- William George Shedden (c.1803–1872), British trader and plantation owner
- William Shedden Ralston (1828–1889), British scholar of Russia and translator
- William George Shedden Dobbie (1879–1964), British army officer
