= Goodrich =

Goodrich may refer to:

- Goodrich (surname)

== Places ==
=== United Kingdom ===
- Goodrich, Herefordshire
- Goodrich Castle, a fortification in Goodrich, Herefordshire
- Goodrich Court, a former neo-gothic castle in Goodrich, Herefordshire

=== United States ===
- Goodrich, Colorado
- Goodrich, Idaho
- Goodrich, Michigan
- Goodrich, North Dakota
- Goodrich, Tennessee
- Goodrich, Texas
- Goodrich, Wisconsin, a town
  - Goodrich (community), Wisconsin, an unincorporated community
- Goodrich Falls, waterfall and unincorporated community in New Hampshire

== Other uses ==
- Goodrich Corporation or B.F. Goodrich Company, former American aerospace manufacturing company
- BFGoodrich, American tires company
- Goodrich Quality Theaters, American movie theater chain
- Goodrich (film), an American comedy film

== See also ==
- Goderich (disambiguation)
- Godric (disambiguation)
