= Coldrick =

Coldrick is a surname. Notable people with the surname include:

- David Coldrick, Gaelic football referee;
- Graham Coldrick (born 1945), Welsh footballer;
- Percy Coldrick (1888–1953), Welsh rugby player;
- Percy Coldrick (trade unionist) (Albert Percival Coldrick; 1913–1999); British trade union leader;
- William Coldrick (1894–1975), British politician.

== See also ==
- Goldrick
