= Goodrich (surname) =

Goodrich is an English toponymic surname, which indicates someone from Goodrich in Herefordshire. The name is a modern form of the Anglo-Saxon given name Godric which is made of the Old Norse word guðini or god combined with the Saxon word ric "ruler", ruler of god. Notable people with the surname include:

- Aaron Goodrich (1807–1887), first Chief Justice of Minnesota Territorial Supreme Court
- Annie Warburton Goodrich (1866–1954), American nurse
- Arthur Goodrich (1878-1941), American playwright
- Benjamin Franklin Goodrich (1841–1888), founder of the Goodrich Corporation
- Caspar F. Goodrich (1847–1925), American admiral
- Charles P. Goodrich (1831–1921), American businessman and politician
- Chauncey Goodrich (1759–1815), senator from Connecticut
- Chauncey A. Goodrich (1790–1860), American clergyman, educator and lexicographer
- Derek Goodrich (1927-2021), English Anglican priest in Guyana
- Edgar J. Goodrich (1896–1969), judge of the United States Board of Tax Appeals
- Edwin Goodrich (1843–1910), American general awarded Medal of Honor in the US Civil War
- Edwin Stephen Goodrich (1868–1946), English zoologist
- Elizur Goodrich (1761–1849), lawyer and politician from Connecticut
- Emily Goodrich Smith (1830–1903), American newspaper correspondent; daughter of Samuel Griswold Goodrich
- Frances Goodrich (1890–1984), American dramatist and screenwriter
- Frederick E. Goodrich (1843–1925), American journalist and political figure
- Gail Goodrich (born 1943), American basketball player
- Herbert Funk Goodrich, (1889–1962), judge on the United States Court of Appeals for the Third Circuit
- Henry Edwin Goodrich, British Labour politician
- James P. Goodrich (1864–1940), Governor of Indiana
- John Goodrich (Loyalist) (1722-1785), Loyalist privateer during the American Revolution
- John Z. Goodrich, lieutenant governor of Massachusetts
- Joseph Goodrich (1800-1867), American pioneer and politician
- Lloyd Goodrich (1897–1987), American art historian
- Luther Carrington Goodrich (1894–1986), American Sinologist
- Mario Goodrich (born 2000), American football player
- Michael T. Goodrich, American mathematician and computer scientist
- Patricia A. Goodrich, American politician
- Samuel Griswold Goodrich (1793–1860), American author, used the pseudonym Peter Parley
- Simon Goodrich (1773–1847), engineer to the British Navy Board
- Thomas Goodrich (bishop) (died 1554), English ecclesiastic
