= Goldrich =

Goldrich is a surname. Notable people with the surname include:

- Ethan A. Goldrich (born 1966), American diplomat
- Jona Goldrich (1927–2016), American real estate developer and philanthropist
- Sybil Niden Goldrich, American consumer rights advocate
- Zina Goldrich (born 1964), American musical theatre composer

== See also ==
- Goldrick, surname
- Goodrich (disambiguation)
