= George Shedden =

George Shedden may refer to a member of the Shedden trading family of Spring Hill, East Cowes, Isle of Wight:

- George Shedden (c.1769–1855)
- George Shedden (c.1856-1937)
- George Powell-Shedden (1916-1994)
