= Wootton railway station =

Former railway station in Isle of Wight, UK

Wootton
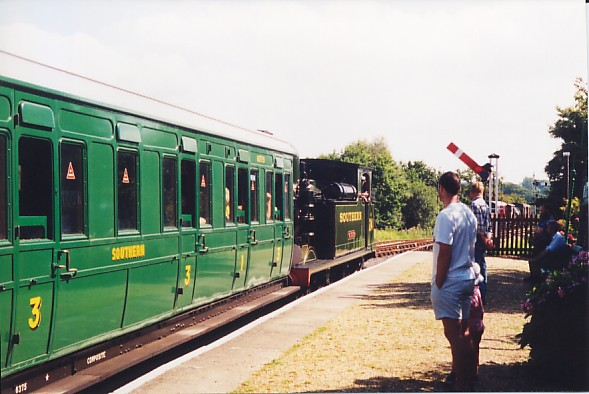
- LSWR O2 Class W24 Calborne arriving at Wootton in 2002

General information
- Location: Wootton Common, Isle of Wight; England
- Coordinates: 50.718127°N 1.240613°W (modern heritage station)
- Grid reference: SZ536913
- System: Station on heritage railway
- Manager: Ryde and Newport Railway (1875 to 1887); Isle of Wight Central Railway (1887 to 1923); Southern Railway (1923 to 1948); Southern Region of British Railways (1948 to 1966); Isle of Wight Steam Railway (since 1971 )
- Platforms: 1

Key dates
- 1875: Opened
- 21 September 1953: Closed
- 1971: Line partially reopened as heritage railway
- 1986: New station on different site
Location

Wootton railway station is a former railway station, and now a recreated heritage station, at Wootton on the Isle of Wight, off the south coast of England.

== History ==
The original station, on the Newport-to-Ryde line, opened in 1875, and was an intermediate stop on (successively) the Ryde and Newport Railway, Isle of Wight Central Railway, Southern Railway and British Railways. The station was expanded in 1898 when a new siding was opened for goods, mineral and livestock traffic.

The original station closed on 21 September 1953, and the line itself closed in 1966. Part of the line was re-opened as the heritage Isle of Wight Steam Railway in 1971. A new station at Wootton, about two hundred yards to the south east of the original, was opened in August 1986, and is now recreated in the style of an Isle of Wight Central Railway-era station.

The Railway received a grant from the LEADER project in November 2011 for a rebuild of Wootton station, which involved extending the platform, extending the headshunt to accommodate the Ivatt tank locomotives, build a replica of the original wooden station building that was at Havenstreet, install new toilets and construct the base for the signal box, which will be relocated to the platform.

Over the Winter period 2019/2020 the Signal box lever frame (formerly located in Shanklin Signal Box) was partially installed, and connected to the lineside infrastructure, as of September 2020, it controls 2 shunt signals, 1 set of points and a facing point lock, a further lever acts as a 'king' lever (which prevents the facing point lock from being withdrawn unless the single line token is present in the box)1 further lever is currently spare, both shunt signals are provided with electric repeaters due to poor sighting, and the Facing point lock retains its fowling bar, a treadle has been provided to assist pointsman in determining when a locomotive has moved clear of the points, the commissioning was completed immediately prior to the first operating days of the 2020 season (which had been delayed due to the COVID-19 travel restrictions).

== Stationmasters ==
- Robert James ca. 1878
- Leonard Fenn ca. 1899
- George Henry Edwards 1910 - ca. 1920 (afterwards station master at Whippingham)
- Mr. Spinks ca. 1920
- Mr. Dibley ca. 1937

Preceding station	Heritage railways	Following station
Terminus	Isle of Wight Steam Railway	Havenstreet towards Smallbrook Junction
Disused railways
Whippingham	British Rail; Southern Region; IoW CR : Newport to Smallbrook Junction line	Havenstreet

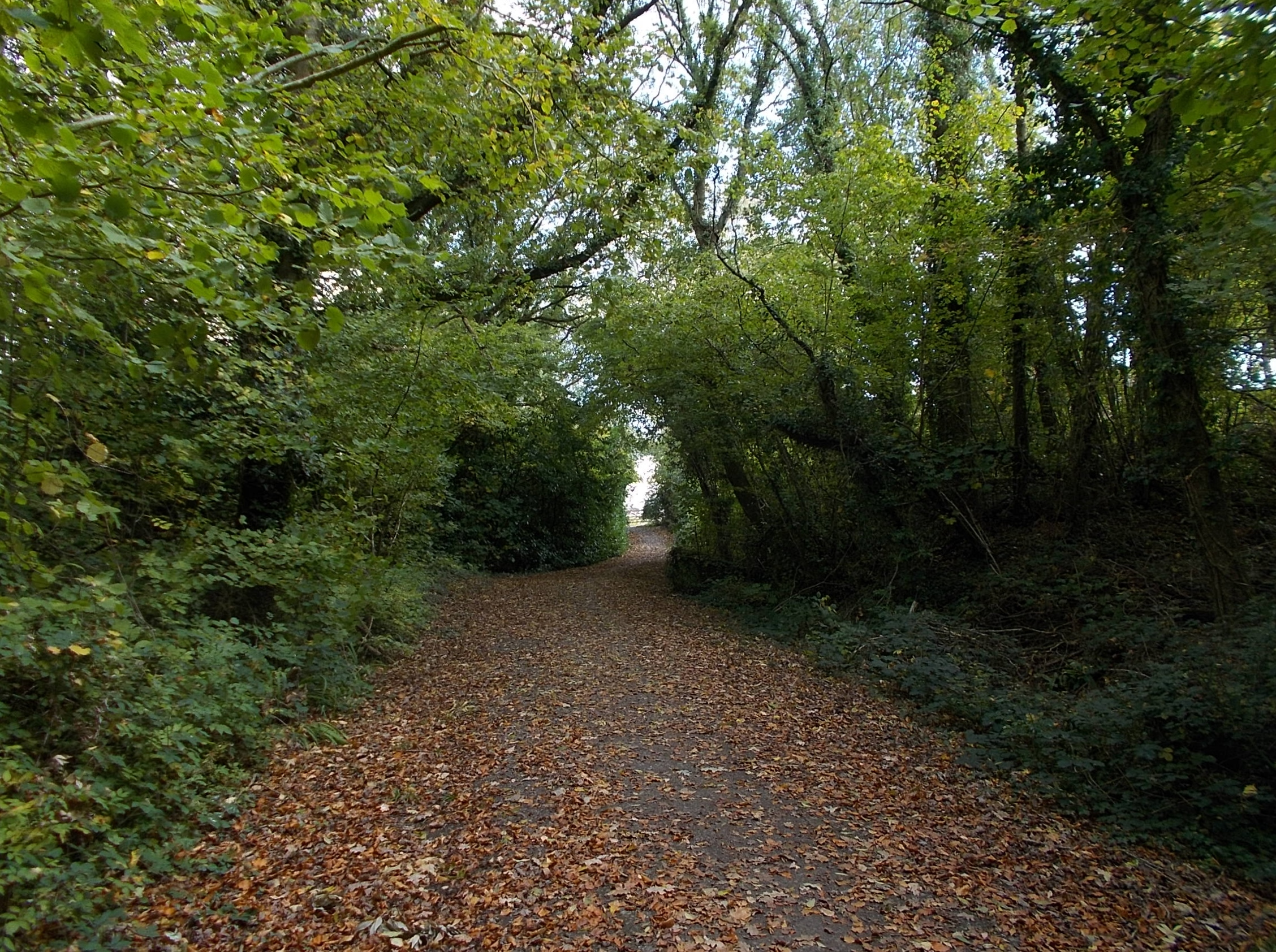
The location of the original station, seen here in 2018. Much of the cutting in which the station was sited has been filled in, and nothing visible remains of the station itself. The old railway track at this location is now a public footpath and cycle track.

== Gallery ==
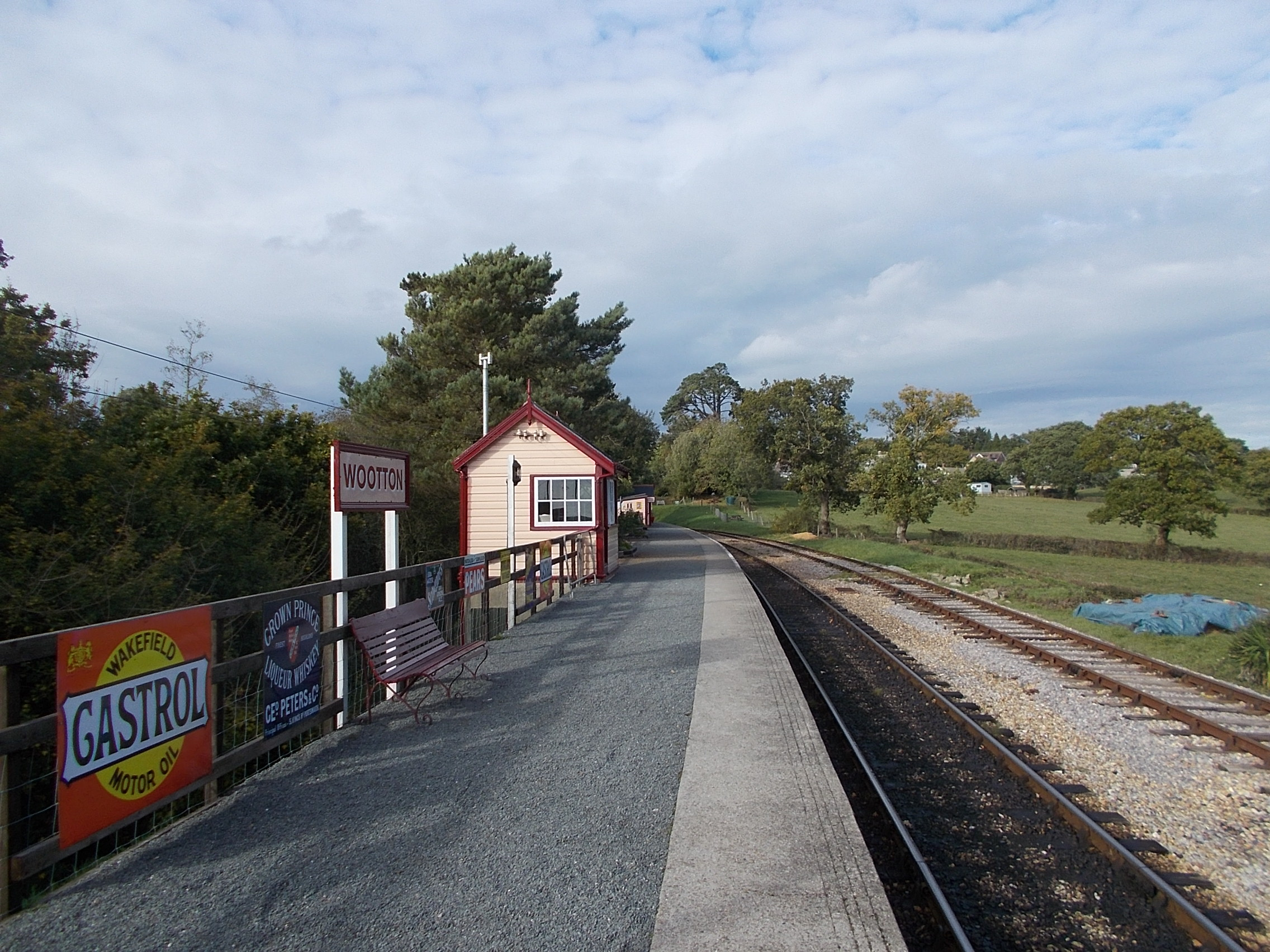
The station in 2018.

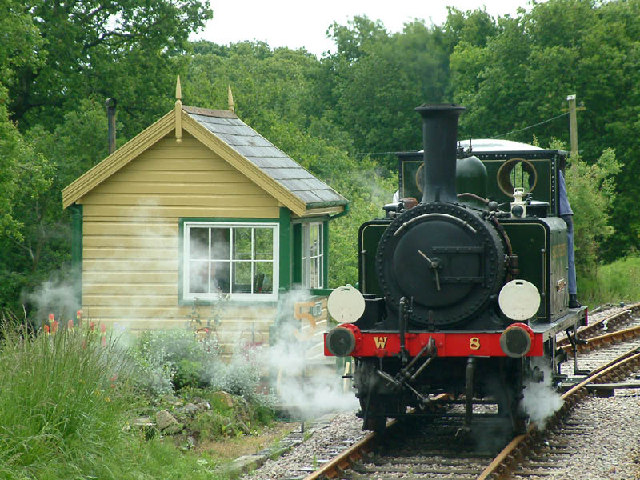
Signal box at Wootton

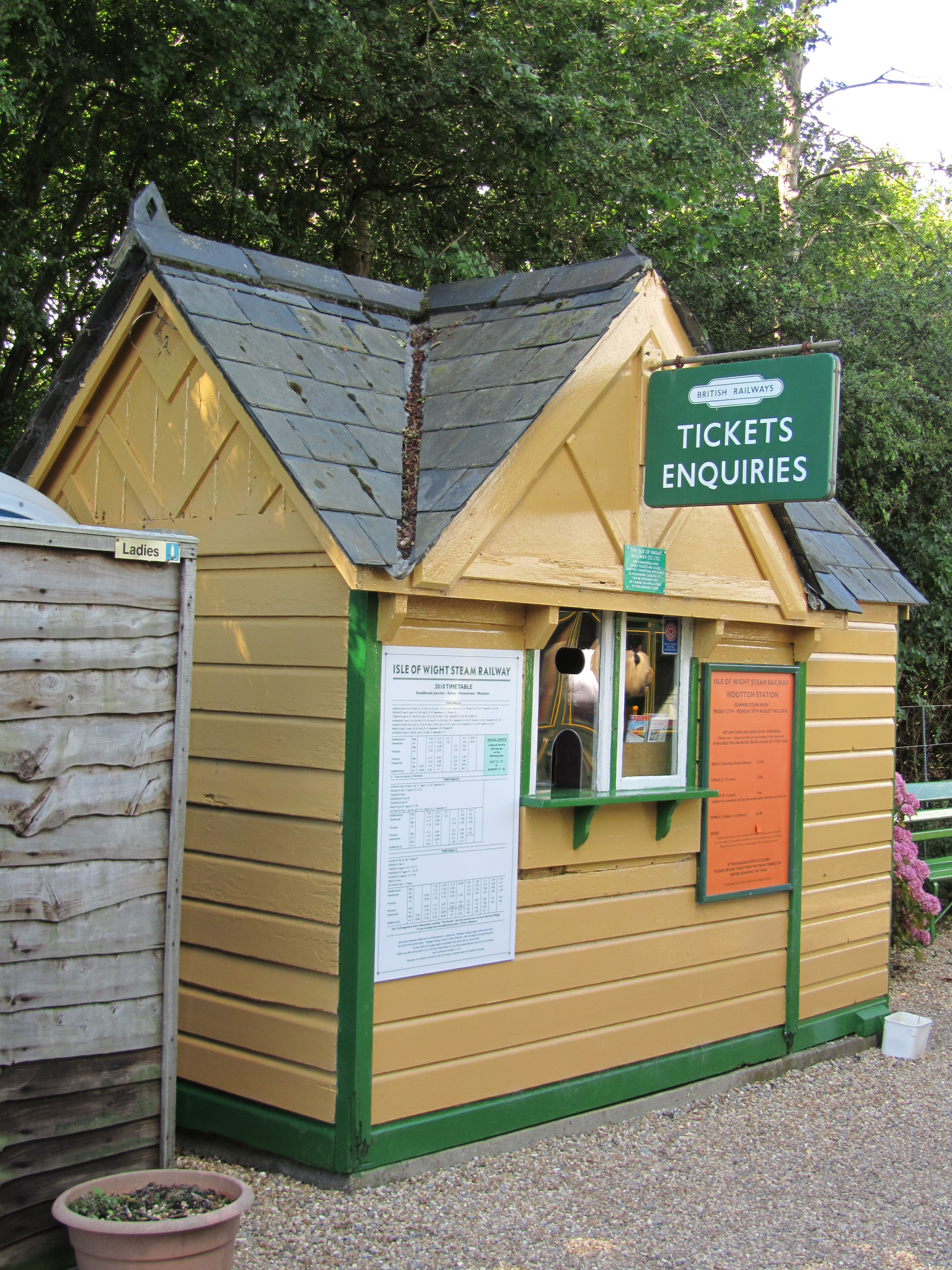
Ticket office at Wootton

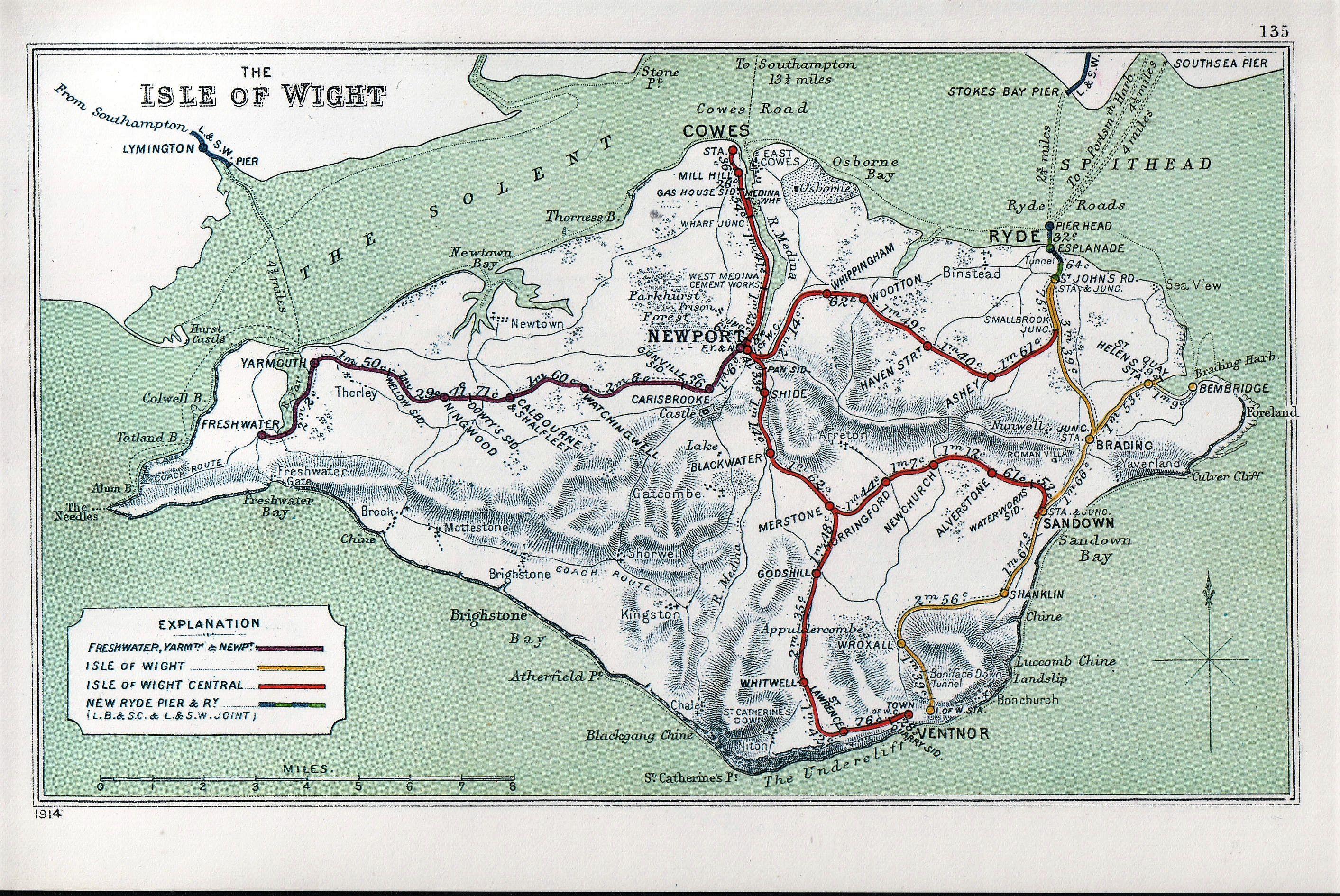
A 1914 Railway Clearing House map of lines around The Isle of Wight.
