= McGoldrick =

McGoldrick is a surname of Irish origin. Notable people with the surname include:

- Barry McGoldrick (born 1985), Irish Gaelic footballer
- David McGoldrick (born 1987), English-born Irish footballer
- Eddie McGoldrick (born 1965), English-born Irish footballer and manager
- Jackson McGoldrick (born 1997), American drag queen, dancer and photographer, also known as Jax
- Jake McGoldrick, American council member
- Joseph McGoldrick (1901–1978), American politician, lawyer, and professor
- Kevin McGoldrick (born 1972), Scottish footballer
- Michael McGoldrick (born 1965), Northern Irish murder victim
- Michael McGoldrick (born 1971), English folk musician
- Patrick McGoldrick (1865–1939), Irish politician
- Ryan McGoldrick (born 1981), Australian rugby league player
- Sean Leo McGoldrick (born 1987), Irish Gaelic footballer
- Sean McGoldrick (born 1991), Welsh boxer
- Tom McGoldrick (1929–2018), English footballer

== See also ==
- Goldrick
