= Goderich =

Goderich may refer to:

== Places ==
- Goderich, Ontario, in Canada
- Goderich, Sierra Leone
- Goderich County, Western Australia
- Goodrich, Herefordshire from which the title Viscount Goderich derives

== Other ==
- Goderich Airport
- Goderich Celtic Roots Festival
- Goderich District Collegiate Institute
- Goderich Ministry
- Goderich Pirates
- Goderich Sailors
- Goderich United
- Goderich–Exeter Railway
- Viscount Goderich
