= Edwin Goodrich =

American Union Army officer

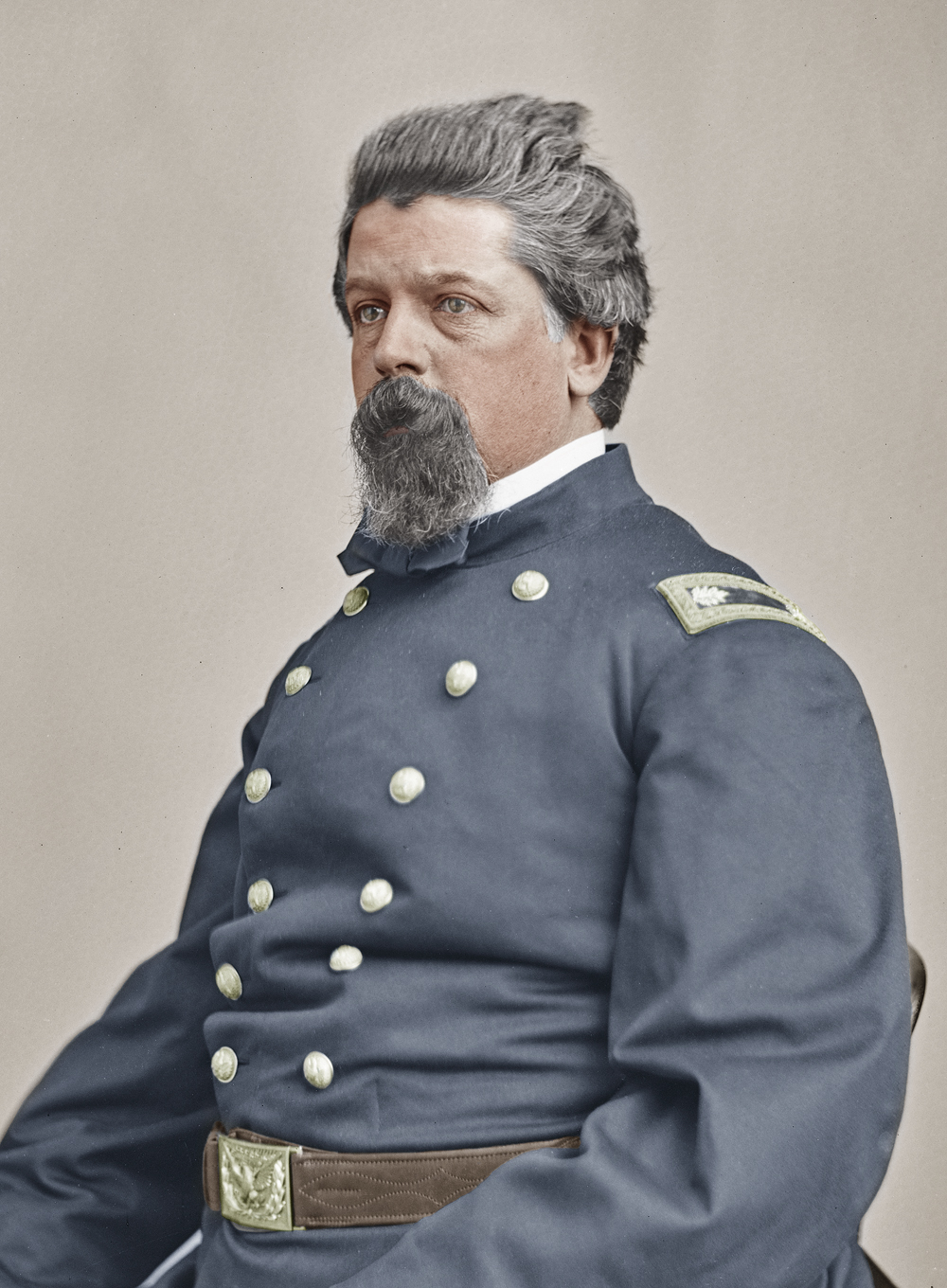
- Born: March 22, 1843; New York City, US
- Died: November 26, 1910 (aged 67); Chicago, Illinois, US
- Burial place: Portland, Michigan, US
- Military career
- Allegiance: United States
- Branch: United States Army; Union Army
- Service years: 1861 - 1865
- Rank: Captain; Lieutenant colonel
- Units: (New York (state)) Company D, 9th New York Volunteer Cavalry Regiment
- Conflicts: American Civil War • Battle of Cedar Creek
- Awards: Medal of Honor

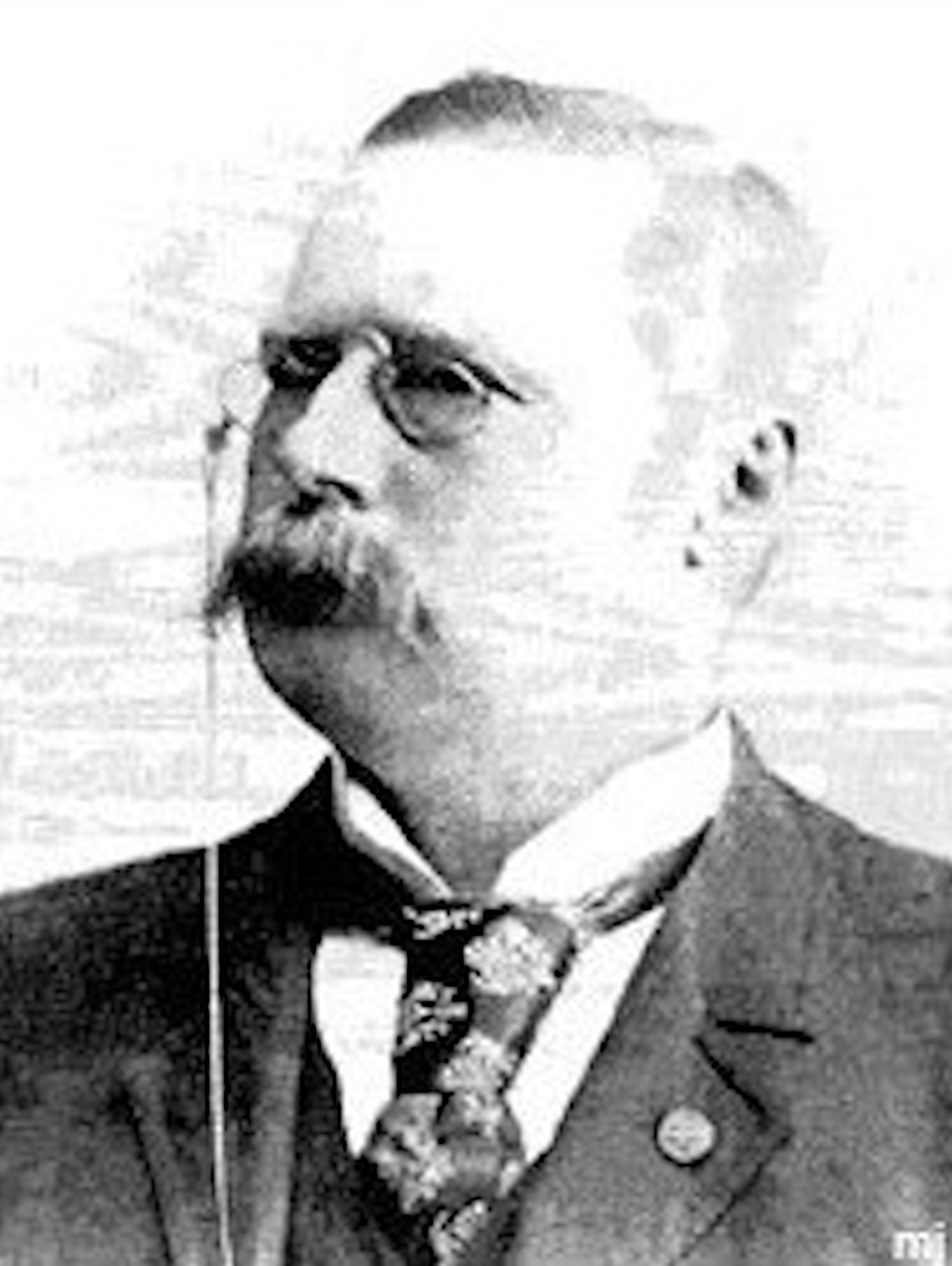
Medal of Honor winner Edwin Goodrich

Edwin Goodrich (March 22, 1843 – November 26, 1910) was a Union Army officer during the American Civil War.

He received the Medal of Honor for gallantry during the Battle of Cedar Creek fought near Middletown, Virginia on October 19, 1864. The battle was the decisive engagement of Major General Philip Sheridan's Valley Campaigns of 1864 and was the largest battle fought in the Shenandoah Valley.

Goodrich enlisted in the Army from Westfield, New York in November 1861. He was commissioned as an officer in February 1864 and mustered out with his regiment in July 1865.

== Medal of Honor citation ==
"The President of the United States of America, in the name of Congress, takes pleasure in presenting the Medal of Honor to First Lieutenant Edwin Goodrich, United States Army, for extraordinary heroism on November, 1864, while serving with Company D, 9th New York Cavalry, in action at Cedar Creek, Virginia. While the command was falling back, First Lieutenant Goodrich returned, and in the face of the enemy rescued a sergeant from under his fallen horse."

== See also ==
- List of Medal of Honor recipients
- List of American Civil War Medal of Honor recipients: G-L
