= Whippingham railway station =

Former railway station in Isle of Wight, UK

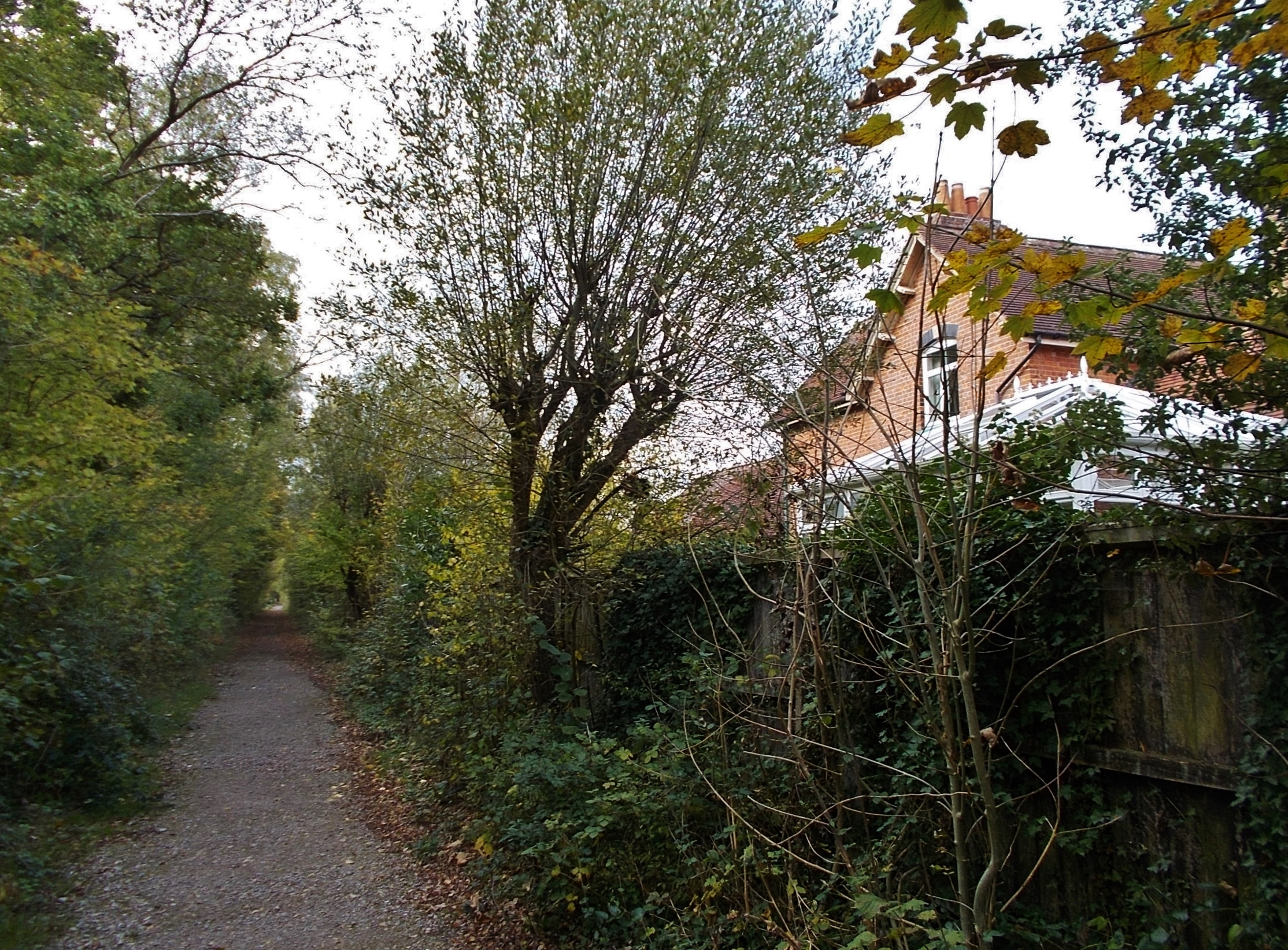
- The site of the former station in 2018. Looking west along the course of the old railway track, with the station house, now a private residence, visible to the right of the picture.

General information
- Location: Opposite Isle of Wight Crematorium, Isle of Wight; England
- Coordinates: 50°43′15″N 1°15′35″W
- Grid reference: SZ 524915
- Platforms: Two

Other information
- Status: Disused

History
- Original company: Ryde and Newport Railway
- Pre-grouping: Isle of Wight Central Railway
- Post-grouping: Southern Railway; Southern Region of British Railways

Key dates
- 1875: Opened
- 21 September 1953: Closed
Location

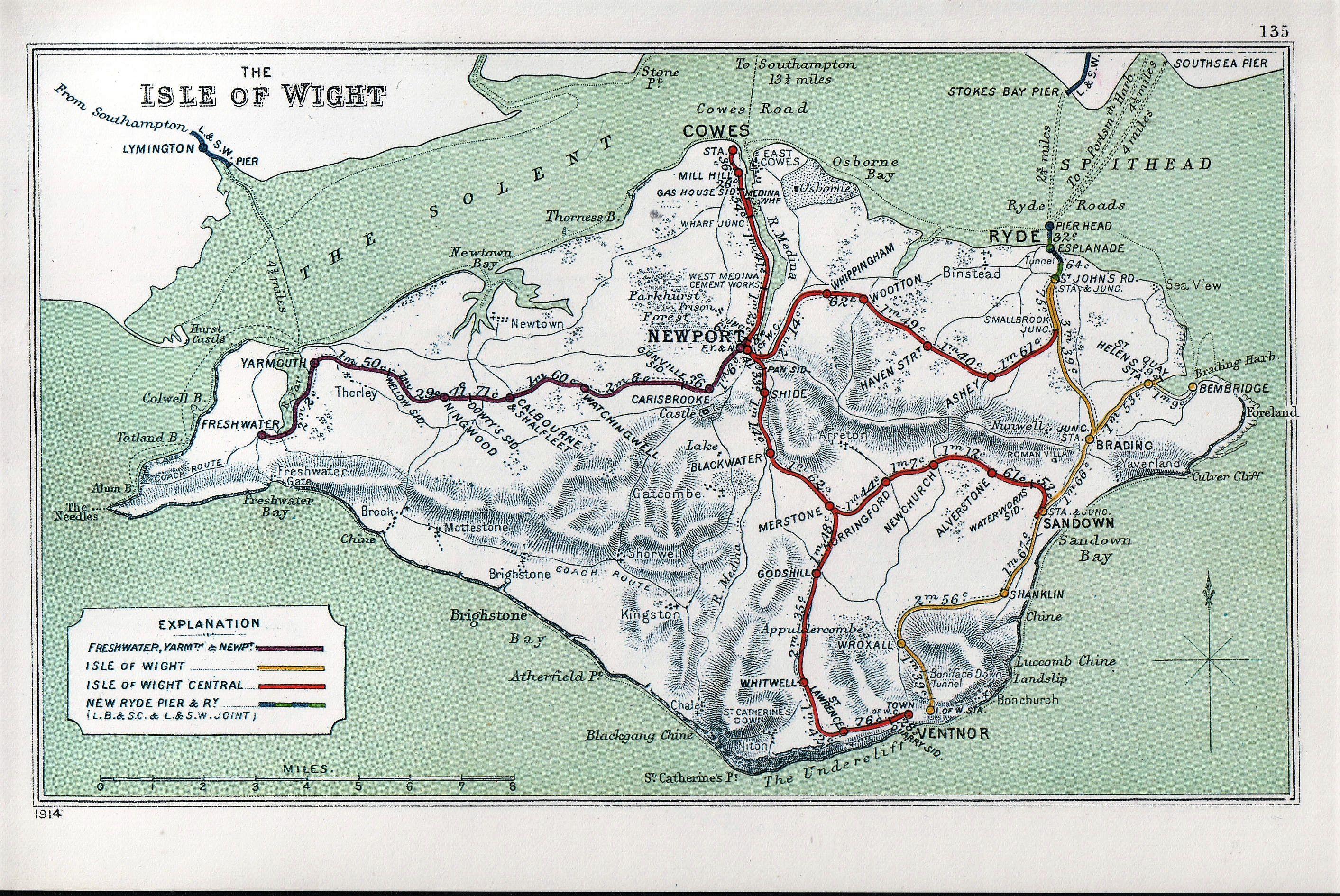
A 1914 Railway Clearing House map of lines around The Isle of Wight.

Whippingham railway station is a former railway station near Whippingham on the Isle of Wight, off the south coast of England.

== History ==
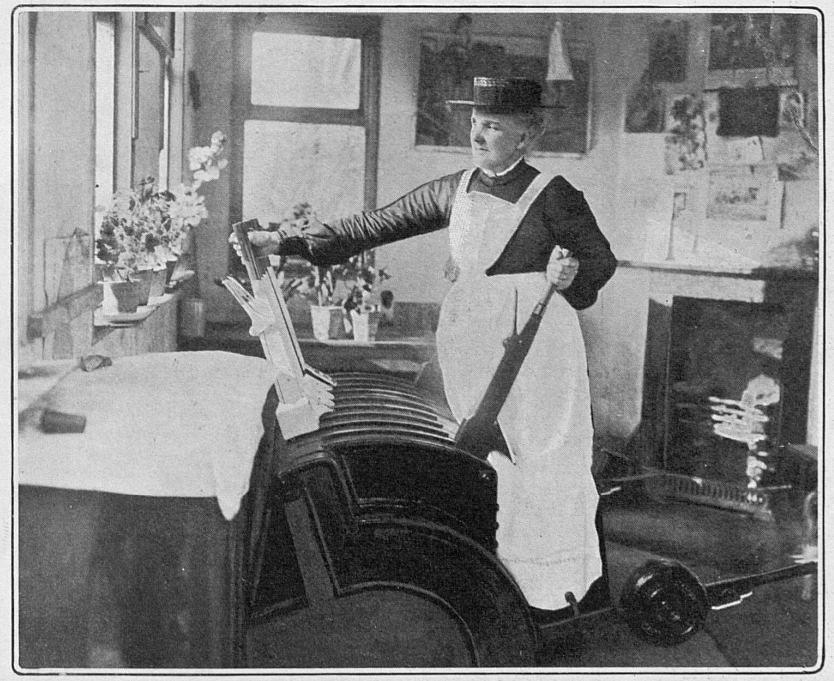
The Lady "Station Master" and "Signalman" at Whippingham Station from The Sketch of 9 December 1903

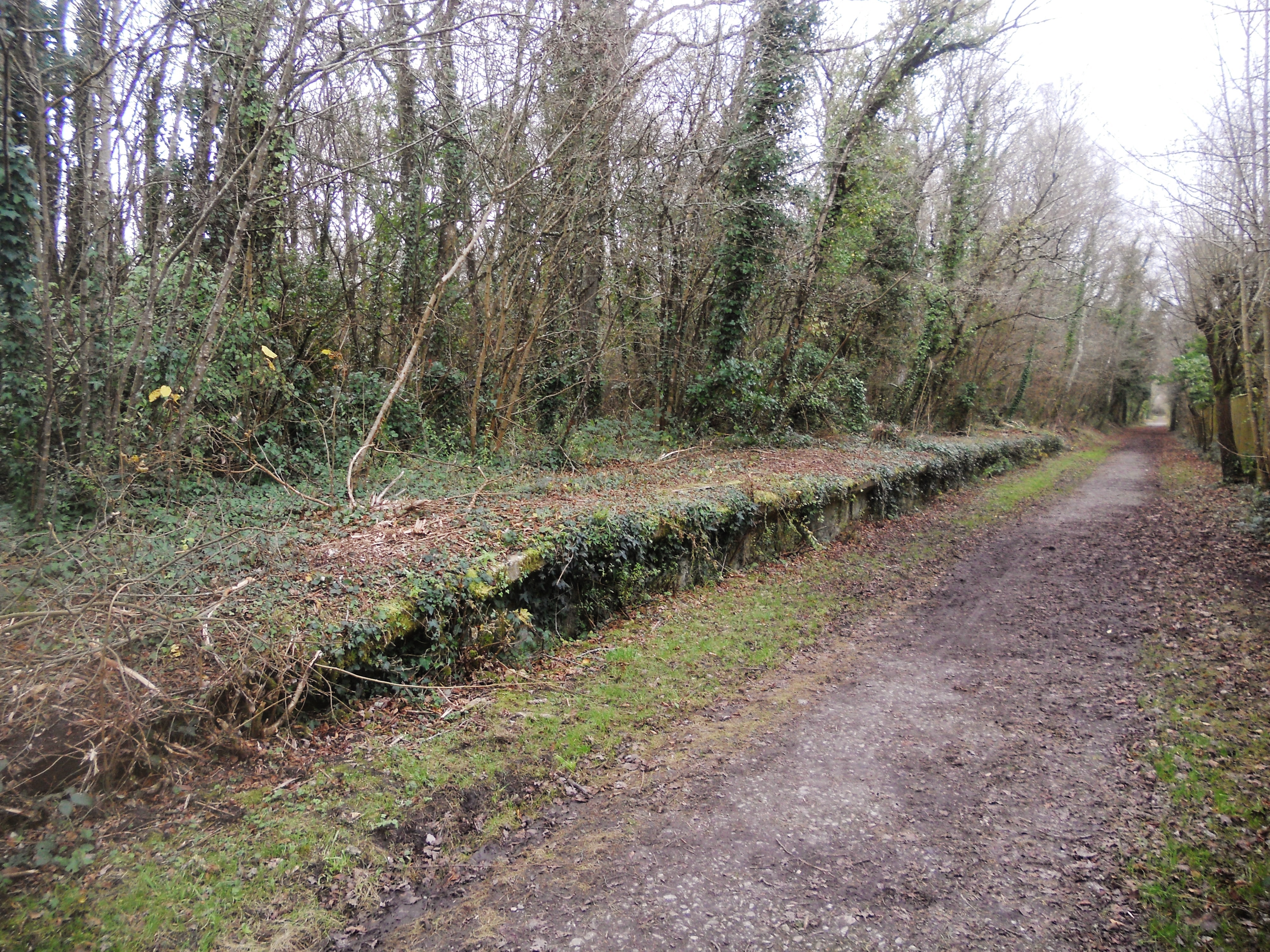
"Down" (south side) platform in 2023 following clearance of vegetation

It was arguably the most underused station on an often sparsely used Island network. It was built solely because of the need to have a station within reasonable proximity to Queen Victoria's Island residence Osborne House, and it is known that Queen Victoria did use the station on at least one occasion, on 11 February 1888, when she travelled from Whippingham to Ventnor and back for the opening of the National Consumption Hospital there. The station is also known to have been used by the young Lord Mountbatten.

The station was described in the Railway Magazine:

Few people know that the delightfully rural station of Whippingham, in the Isle of Wight, was originally built to be a private station, though now it may be said to have become quite a public one. The station is near the charming village which was so dear to the heart of her late Majesty Queen Victoria, and, when it was first planned it was intended that the station should be kept exclusively for the use of the Queen, the Roval family, or visitors to Osborne. But with her usual kindness of heart and thoughtfulness for her humblest dependents, Queen Victoria soon saw what a boon it would be for the surrounding tenantry and villagers to be able to use Whippingham Station, rather than to have to go to Cowes or Newport, and then return for miles to their homes. So she graciously allowed her private station to be used by almost everybody who wished, until at length it became a really public station.

It would indeed be difficult to find a more lovely spot than Whippingham. or a nicer station for a country village than is the one there. It has seen many historic sights, too; being probably the only private railway station—in our time—that can boast of such renown. Royalties from far and near have here detrained: men and women famous over the world have trodden its platform when visiting or leaving the great Qeeen of England; it has witnessed the joy of marriages and the pain of deaths amongst the Royal family in a way no other station has done.

A woman presides over its destinies, just as does one at Watchingwell, not many miles distant. Stationmistresses are not so common in our islands as to have ceased to attract attention from passing travellers, and these on the Isle of Wight Central Railway draw more than a moderate share of public attention from the yearly thousands of visitors to the "Garden of England".

In its early days its passenger carrying status was ambiguous and, although always clean and tidy, it was never very busy. A passing loop was added in 1912 and indeed was retained for a further three years after closure in 1953. Trains continued to pass through the station until the line was closed in 1966.

The station house, now a private dwelling, still stands, with the only other building within any sort of close proximity being the Island crematorium. The old railway track at the location is now a public footpath and cycle track. The old "down" platform is still visible beside the track.

== Stationmasters ==
- William Godwin from 1875
- Henry Walker ca. 1881
- Emily Merwood 1888 - ca. 1914
- George Henry Edwards ca. 1920 (formerly station master at Wootton)
- Mr. Dew ca. 1935
- Mr. Dibley ca. 1937

Preceding station	Disused railways	Following station
Newport; Line and station closed	British Rail; Southern Region; IoW CR : Newport to Smallbrook Junction line	Wootton; Line and station closed

== See also ==
- List of closed railway stations in Britain
