= Goldrick =

Goldrick is a surname. Notable people with the surname include:

- Emma Goldrick, pseudonym used by Emma Elizabeth Jean Sutcliffe (1923–2008) and Robert N. Goldrick (1919–1996), American writers
- James Goldrick (born 1958), Royal Australian Navy admiral
- Sinéad Goldrick (born 1990), Irish footballer

== See also ==
- Sara Goldrick-Rab, American academic
- McGoldrick, surname
- Goldrich, surname
