= Goderich Celtic Roots Festival =

Annual music festival in Canada

The Celtic Roots Festival is a three-day Celtic festival held annually by Lake Huron in the town of Goderich, Ontario. The festival celebrates traditional Celtic music and craft by showcasing a wide variety of musicians and artisans. Musical acts have come from as far afield as Ireland, Scotland, and Wales, but have also included popular North American folk artists such as Maura O'Connell, The Wailin' Jennys, and Garnet Rogers.Their intention is to "produce events which foster awareness, participation, and education in the world of traditional Celtic culture."

The festival was first held in 1992. It was founded by local music teacher Warren Robinson.
