= John Goodrich (Loyalist) =

Loyalist privateer during the American Revolution

John Goodrich (1722–1785) was a Virginia-born British planter, merchant shipper, and privateer. Uncommitted at the beginning of the American Revolution, he was recruited by Lord Dunmore to become a Loyalist privateer. By his own estimation, he destroyed five hundred vessels in the service of the British Crown.

== Family ==
Goodrich was born in Virginia in 1722, one of several children of John Goodrich (d. 1746). Unlike many Loyalists, Goodrich had deep roots in colonial America; his immigrant ancestor, "John Guttreidge", had patented land in Virginia in 1654. In 1747 he married the descendant of another prominent local family, Margaret Bridger, a descendant of the 17th-century Virginia political figure General Joseph Bridger. They raised a large family, including a number of sons that would follow their father into mercantile pursuits and, later, privateering. One of his daughters, Agatha, married Robert Shedden, who would also become a prominent Loyalist as well as Goodrich's business partner. Some of his close relatives ended up on the opposite side of the conflict, including two nephews who served as officers on the Patriot side.

== Before the Revolution ==
A keen businessman, Goodrich spent his early adult years expanding his landholdings. Over the course of several years, he purchased hundreds of acres of land in Nansemond and Isle of Wight counties. By 1771 he owned over 2,000 acres of land, some of it described as the best land in the county. Starting in the 1760s, he began to turn his interest from farming to shipping. He and his sons owned and operated a dozen ships by 1774, and Goodrich also owned his own wharves, dry goods stores, warehouses, and other establishments useful to his shipping business. Operating primarily out of Portsmouth, his small fleet shipped agricultural and timber commodities to the West Indies and to other ports in the colonies.

== Early Revolutionary War activities ==
The Revolutionary War posed a serious threat to merchants like Goodrich, with blockades cutting off imports and exports, and privateers from both sides attacking merchant vessels. Goodrich himself does not seem to have been particularly ideological; both sides of the conflict apparently understood he was more motivated by profit than politics. Regardless, the Patriot side decided to enlist the aid of the Goodrich family. Using one of Goodrich's sons, William, as a go-between, they provided £5,000 for the purchase of powder in the West Indies, with the understanding that John Goodrich, the father, would assist him in successfully bringing the cargo back without attracting notice. The family elected to also purchase other cargo on the trip, risking the wrath of both the British and Patriot sides.

This mission proved to be a debacle for the Goodriches. Though the powder did reach its destination, an intercepted letter to John Goodrich from his son-in-law Robert Shedden revealed the conspiracy to Dunmore, who took Shedden and another of Goodrich's sons into custody. With John Goodrich Jr., held as hostage, the elder John Goodrich sought an audience with Dunmore, where he expressed "sincere repentance of what was past and his earnest desire of returning to his duty". Though he recognized Goodrich's essentially mercenary character, Dunmore seized the opportunity to augment British forces with a family of experienced, capable, and ambitious ship captains. Having been convinced that his family's interests would be better served by the British, Goodrich and his family turned to the Loyalist cause.

"The male part consists of a Father and seven Sons, five of whom are arrived to the age of manhood, who are now most zealously engaged in His Majesty's Service. Four of them are perfectly well acquainted with every River, Creek, or Branch within this bay. I have now five of their Vessels employed constantly running up the Rivers, where they have orders to seize, burn or destroy every thing that is water born... They have all left their Houses, Negroes, Plantations, Stocks, and every thing else at the Mercy of the Rebels, and are now with their whole Familys Water Born in this Fleet."

— Lord Dunmore, letter to George Germain, Secretary of State for America

The start of Goodrich's career as a Loyalist was not auspicious. He set out to the West Indies to reclaim some of the money that had been left with a merchant there to purchase additional powder, but was quickly captured by British forces unaware of his new loyalties and promptly sent back to Dunmore. The Patriots were, likewise, initially confused regarding his loyalties. He was actually imprisoned by the Commonwealth of Virginia, which suspected him "of being unfriendly to the Colony", but when witnesses failed to appear he was released on a bond of £1,000 and the condition that he not be of assistance to America's enemies. Goodrich and two of his sons were almost immediately charged again, this time with violating the Articles of Association. On 9 March 1776, the Virginia Committee of Safety sequestered the lands and property of the Goodrich family, and when one of the Goodrich sons was caught attempting to transport slaves and stock from the sequestered property, the committee had the property confiscated and put up for auction. This marked a decisive break with the Patriot side; General Charles Lee ordered Goodrich's house, as well as two of his ships, burned, justifying it on the grounds that Goodrich was one "of the most notorious Traitors", and that it would be a warning to others not to work with Dunmore.

== Loyalist privateer ==
"They landed 60 men where there was no force collected to oppose them, and burnt the warehouses on Wicomico River with between two and three hundred hogsheads of tobacco and three private houses, carrying off a Gentleman from one of them with several slaves from the neighborhood. Finding the militia were assembling, they embarked and disappeared declaring their purpose was to burn every warehouse on Potomac River."

— Richard Henry Lee, letter to Samuel Adams describing a Goodrich raid

Under his agreement with Dunmore, Goodrich's ships had been commissioned directly into government service, and he and his sons became some of the most notorious of the Loyalist privateers. He was captured in North Carolina on 17 April 1776 while engaged in privateering, and by May was in a Virginia jail. Being found guilty of treason, his entire estate was confiscated and he was imprisoned under guard, effectively a prisoner of war. His sons vehemently rejected the committee's offer of neutrality and continued in royal service, with one joining Simcoe's Rangers, and John Goodrich himself returned to privateering after escaping prison. Later in the war, Goodrich's privateering operation moved to New York, and grew over the course of the war to four fighting vessels; the largest, The Dunmore, was a sixteen-gun ship.

== After the war ==
After the war, Goodrich and several of his family members left the United States and settled in England. He died in November 1785, aged 63 years, and was interred at Topsham Church in Devon. Edmund Randolph, in his History of Virginia, remarked regarding Goodrich and his sons that "Virginia never repaired the loss which she sustained in these men."

In England, the descendants of John Goodrich were known as the Goodriches of Energlyn. His son John Goodrich Jr. was High Sheriff of Glamorganshire in 1798, while another descendant, James Pitt Goodrich, was High Sheriff of Denbighshire in 1878. His Shedden descendants prospered as well; they lived for several generations at their estate at Spring Hill, East Cowes.
