= Spring Hill, East Cowes =

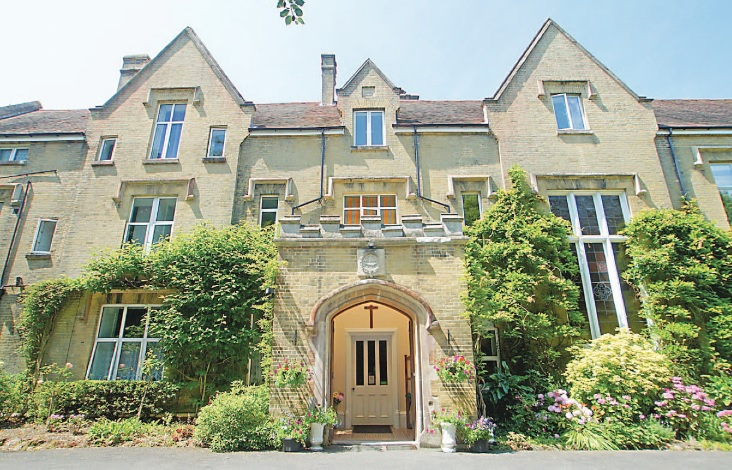
- Spring Hill House, as a convent

General information
- Architectural style: Unknown
- Location: East Cowes, Isle of Wight, England
- Coordinates: 50.761441°N 1.278215°W
- Construction started: Conversion 1863
- Client: William George Shedden

Technical details
- Structural system: Brick

Design and construction
- Architect: T W Burrell esq.
- Engineer: Dashwood Builders

Spring Hill, East Cowes is an estate on the Isle of Wight, England, centred around the manor house of the same name. It was to become the family home of the Shedden family. The estate has sweeping views over The Solent. It currently occupies 22 acres, although it was formerly larger, around 100 acres. The estate encompasses Spring Hill House, a farmhouse, farm cottage, a gatehouse, one other large residence and around half a dozen fields. From the 1800s, East Cowes contained four prominent estates, with Spring Hill being among the first to be built. Spring Hill lay between East Cowes Castle and Norris Castle, with Osborne House, the country estate of Queen Victoria, nearby.

Spring Hill estate was purchased in 1794 by the wealthy William Goodrich, partner in a Bristol shipping business with his brother-in-law, Robert Shedden. The business traded in tobacco and sugar and at the time, East Cowes was the main customs post for importing tobacco and rice into Great Britain from America, making the Isle of Wight a useful base for him. William Goodrich and his wife, Catherine Cole, moved into Spring Hill in 1794. Their daughter Mary and her husband George Shedden, soon moved to the Isle of Wight as well, living in the nearby Slatwoods estate, in Old Road, East Cowes.

Spring Hill House was rebuilt in 1863, by Goodrich's grandson, William George Shedden. The house now encompasses 15,380 square feet and has 30 bedrooms. In 1947, Spring Hill was purchased by the Congregation of Holy Cross, who used it as a convent until 2016, when it was sold to a development company.

== History ==
The story of Spring Hill largely centres around the Shedden family, who originally hailed from Scotland. The eighteen year-old Robert Shedden left Scotland for America in 1759, to seek his fortune. However, his plans were put in great jeopardy by the American War of Independence, but his fortune was ultimately made by it. Coincidentally, the story also features two Isle of Wights. Isle of Wight County, Virginia, United States and the County of the Isle of Wight, England.

=== Robert Shedden and John Goodrich ===
None of these two men ever lived at Spring Hill, which became the home of their descendants. However, their story is pivotal, as to how the family earned their fame and fortune.

Arriving in Isle of Wight County, Virginia, America, the fortune-seeking Scot, Robert Shedden found himself at the Nansemond Tobacco Plantation, owned by John Goodrich, where he was given employment. Goodrich also had a merchant trading business, owning 25 ships, which largely transported tobacco to Britain and gunpowder back to America. Shedden prospered there and he soon ended up in partnership with Goodrich. He also ended up marrying John Goodrich's fourteen-year-old daughter Agatha in 1767 and their families were further joined, when Robert's younger brother Jack married Mary Goodrich, another of John Goodrich's daughters.

With the start of the American War of Independence in 1775, much of the trade between Britain and America was outlawed. This put the Sheddens and Goodrichs in a difficult position and led to them both falling foul of the American authorities.

Robert Shedden was arrested in 1776, charged with supporting the Crown. However, he managed to escape and set sail for New York City, which was still under British control. He lost everything when his property was seized and his house burned to the ground. John Goodrich went on the run, but was captured in 1778 and imprisoned at Williamsburg. He was awaiting a death sentence for treason, but also managed to escape and make his way to New York.

=== A family of privateers ===
After escaping to New York, John Goodrich published the following 'advertisement' in the Rivington Royal Gazette of 13 April 1778, a loyalist newspaper of the British controlled New York.

"John Goodrich having extricated himself from the hands of the Virginian rebels (a set of perfidious cruel villains) wishes to see his Friends and his Sons, to fall on ways and means, to square the yards with his persecutors."

Goodrich got his wish when his son Bridger, along with Robert Shedden; and using two of the family's small, but fast ships, decided to become privateers. Attacking and capturing American navy and trading ships, they confiscated the ships' cargoes. This not only earned them their revenge, but it also aided the British war effort, and because of the considerable ‘prize money’ involved, was also extremely lucrative for them. They did this work very successfully for the next 6 years, until the American war of independence ended in 1783.

In the 1810 book, 'History of Virginia' by Edmund Randolph, it is said that John Goodrich and his 3 sons seemingly captured so many Virginian ships that the whole British navy could match them. As Americans, the Goodrich family were also referred to as arch-traitors to the cause of an independent America.

In March 1778, the armed sloop Hammond, commanded by Captain Bridger Goodrich captured the sloop 'Esther', containing 65 Hogsheads of tobacco, from South Quay in Virginia. The story said that in the previous 4 months, he had taken 9 prizes. In April 1780, a British ship called the 'Crown Galley' containing stores and clothing for 500 cavalry soldiers and 50 cannons was taken by an American privateer, but was happily retaken by Goodrich and Shedden's Hammond. In May of 1781, one of their rich trading ships, bound for London, was almost intercepted by the American 'Hector'. Luckily the Virginia, one of their other ships, was on hand to prevent this from happening. In September 1781, in their ship the Virginia, they captured the schooner Susannah, laden with sugar, from Port-au-Prince. In January 1783, the Goodrich ship Virginia, captained by Stanton Hazzard, captured a French ship called the Ranetta, carrying bale goods valued at £40,000. The Ranetta put up quite a fight and 33 men of the Virginia were killed or wounded.

When the war ended in 1783, being unable to carry on their lives as privateers and unable to remain in America, the Shedden and the Goodrich families left New York for good in the Virginian ship, 'Hazard'. It was said that they abandoned Virginia when Lord Dunmore left the country. They settled in Bristol, an important British trading port and by then, hugely wealthy from all of the prize money they had seized, they set up a number of new business ventures.

However, John Goodrich did not have long to enjoy his new life in England, dying just a few years later in 1785.

=== Robert Shedden & Sons ===
In 1786, Robert Shedden established this merchant business, with his two eldest sons, George (listed below) and Robert Shedden Jr. Following the Treaty of Paris, trading could again recommence with America and so their import/export business was restarted from the other side of the Atlantic. As well as this, they also did a lot of trading with Willie Shedden's New York company, Shedden, Patrick & Co, who by 1788 were said to be one of the most successful businesses in New York.

Robert Shedden & Sons were said to be turning over £150,000 per year, but by the mid-1790s, started to concentrate their trade in New Brunswick and the West Indies. They imported sugar and rum, whilst exporting European and Indian produce. The company owned a fleet of ships, but also leased some as well. During this period, the company suffered at the hands of American and French privateers, incurring huge losses. However, despite this, the business was still extremely profitable.

Robert Shedden went on to diversify into the insurance market and he became a leading name at Lloyds, along with his son, George. Robert's knowledge of the merchant trade and shipping, in Britain, America and the West Indies, was invaluable to Lloyds and there are several landmark legal cases in his name. He was also a key member of many of the Lloyds committees.

Just after the turn of the century, the business acquired a sugar plantation in Trelawny, Jamaica. This consisted of 167 acres of land, worked by around 290 slaves. Later, the Sheddens also bought interests in other Jamaican plantations as well.

=== William Goodrich (1794–1812) ===
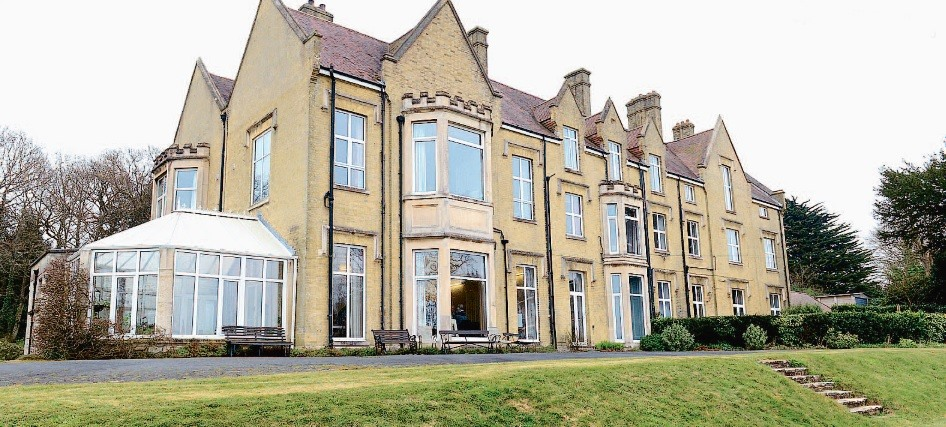
Spring Hill House, Isle of Wight

Like Robert Shedden and his brother, Bridger Goodrich, William became a privateer using more of the family ships. In October 1778, with his sloop, the 'Lady Dunmore', Captain William Goodrich captured a brigantine called the Bold Defence, bound for Baltimore. The ship 'Lady Dunmore' was named after the wife of Lord Dunmore, the Governor of Virginia. Around the same time, William also captured an armed schooner called Liberty, which put up some resistance, killing one man and wounding two others. However, Goodrich's men, boarded the Liberty with their cutlasses in their teeth and captured her.

In December 1778, he captured a French Brig, carrying coffee and indigo, said to be worth £12,000. In December 1779, he captured a sloop laden with tobacco and carried it in to New York. In December 1780, he captured a Spanish ship, carrying 38,000 dollars, 40,000lbs of Spanish Indigo, 50 hogsheads of sugar, some tobacco and many other valuable items.

In 1783, with the war of Independence over, he sailed to Britain and settled in Bristol, with the rest of his family. However, in 1794, William Goodrich decided to retire to the Isle of Wight and bought the Spring Hill estate. At that time, the house was described as being characterised by no peculiarities of design, but standing on the brow of a hill, it commanded views of the Solent. The neighbourhood was described as being extremely beautiful, being almost entirely covered with charming seats and villas. His neighbours included Lord Henry Seymour of the adjoining Norris Castle and on the other side by the architect John Nash at East Cowes Castle.

Life must have seemed very quiet for him there, after all of his adventures in the Americas. One of his concerns in 1803, was to threaten in the local papers to prosecute anyone caught taking sand or soil from the seashore of Spring Hill. However, of more significance in 1803, was that Lieutenant general James Arnold of the Royal Engineers, stayed with Goodrich at Spring Hill whilst awaiting his convoy's departure to the West Indies. He was the son of the renowned American General Benedict Arnold. One of the reasons given for why James stayed at Spring Hill was that the estate was within sight of his ship. In 1807, he married Virginia Goodrich.

William became a churchwarden of St Mildred's Church, Whippingham and would have been involved in its demolition in 1804, followed by it being rebuilt to another design by John Nash. He had involvement in local highway administration and was a member of the board that examined and licensed the seventy pilot boats that operated from Cowes.

William Goodrich and his family stayed at Spring Hill until 1812, moving out to another 'cottage orné' in East Cowes, also designed for them by John Nash, so that George and Mary Shedden, together with their fourteen children, could take over the more spacious Spring Hill. William Goodrich died at Slatwoods in 1816, by that time owned by Robert Shedden, who had also joined the Goodrich's on the Isle of Wight. Slatwoods itself was a sumptuous estate of 23 acres, with the house consisting of thirteen bed and dressing rooms. The house and estate no longer exists.

=== George Shedden (1812–1855) ===
George was Robert Shedden's son. Robert, by now, a hugely wealthy man, had set up a number of businesses in Bristol and in London. He also became a West Indian merchant and slave-owner, owning part of the Stewart Castle Estate in Jamaica. Robert Shedden went on to become Lord of the Manor of Paulerspury.

Eventually, his business empire was handed over to his sons, George and Robert Jr. This included the family business, Robert Shedden & Sons, detailed above. Like his father-in-law, William Goodrich, George decided to move to the Isle of Wight in 1794 and was ultimately given Spring Hill by him in 1812. However, he continued to be a highly successful businessman, ultimately becoming Chairman of Lloyd's of London. George married his cousin, Mary Goodrich in 1796.

George was a strong advocate in favour of slavery, due to his own and the family's interests in Jamaican plantations. In 1831, he was one of 41 signatories, who argued that he condition of the slaves had been grossly misrepresented and that the abolition of slavery would cause the devastation of the West Indies, resulting in loss of life among the white population, leading to the misery of the black population. In 1833, 196 signatories again rallied to prevent the abolition of slavery, including the business, Robert Shedden & Sons, by then controlled by George. However, slavery was abolished there in 1834, with the Sheddens receiving £9,100 in compensation for the freeing of their 570 Jamaican slaves, with two thirds of this money going to George.

In 1844, George Shedden, like his father, had much more mundane problems, with people stealing from the Spring Hill seashore. He took Thomas Smith, a master mariner, to court for stealing stones, which he used as ballast in his ship. However, the defendant said that the stones were from below the high-water mark and he was therefore declared not guilty.

George Shedden also had residences at Paulersbury Park, Northants; at Knockmarloch, Ayrshire and at Hardmead, Buckinghamshire. He had also inherited his father's estates in Jamaica. He died in 1855 at the age of 86, leaving Spring Hill to his fifth child, William. George Shedden was described as having a life which was spent in the continued act of benevolence to the poor and showed good will to all men. He left £160,000 in his will, a huge sum of money in those days.

=== William George Shedden (1855–1872) ===
It is known that William George Shedden continued to have interests in the Jamaican sugar plantations.

William moved out of Spring Hill when he married at the age of 58, the 44-year old Caroline, daughter of Sir Graham Hamond GCB, in 1861. His brother Roscow Cole Shedden then resided there. However, William later returned and rebuilt the house in 1863, greatly enlarging it. It was reported that the work on the new mansion was completed in 1865 and that William Shedden celebrated by holding a dinner at the Medina Hotel for the 70 workmen employed on the project. Three professional singers provided entertainment. The architect was Mr T W Burrell, esq. and the mansion was built by Dashwood Builders of Ryde.

In 1867, he held a croquet party at Spring Hill for around 150 of 'the elite' of the Isle of Wight.

William was a magistrate for Hampshire and an ex officio member of the Board of guardians. He died at Spring Hill in 1872, although as he died without issue, the estate again passed to Roscow.

=== Roscow Cole Shedden (1872–1877) ===
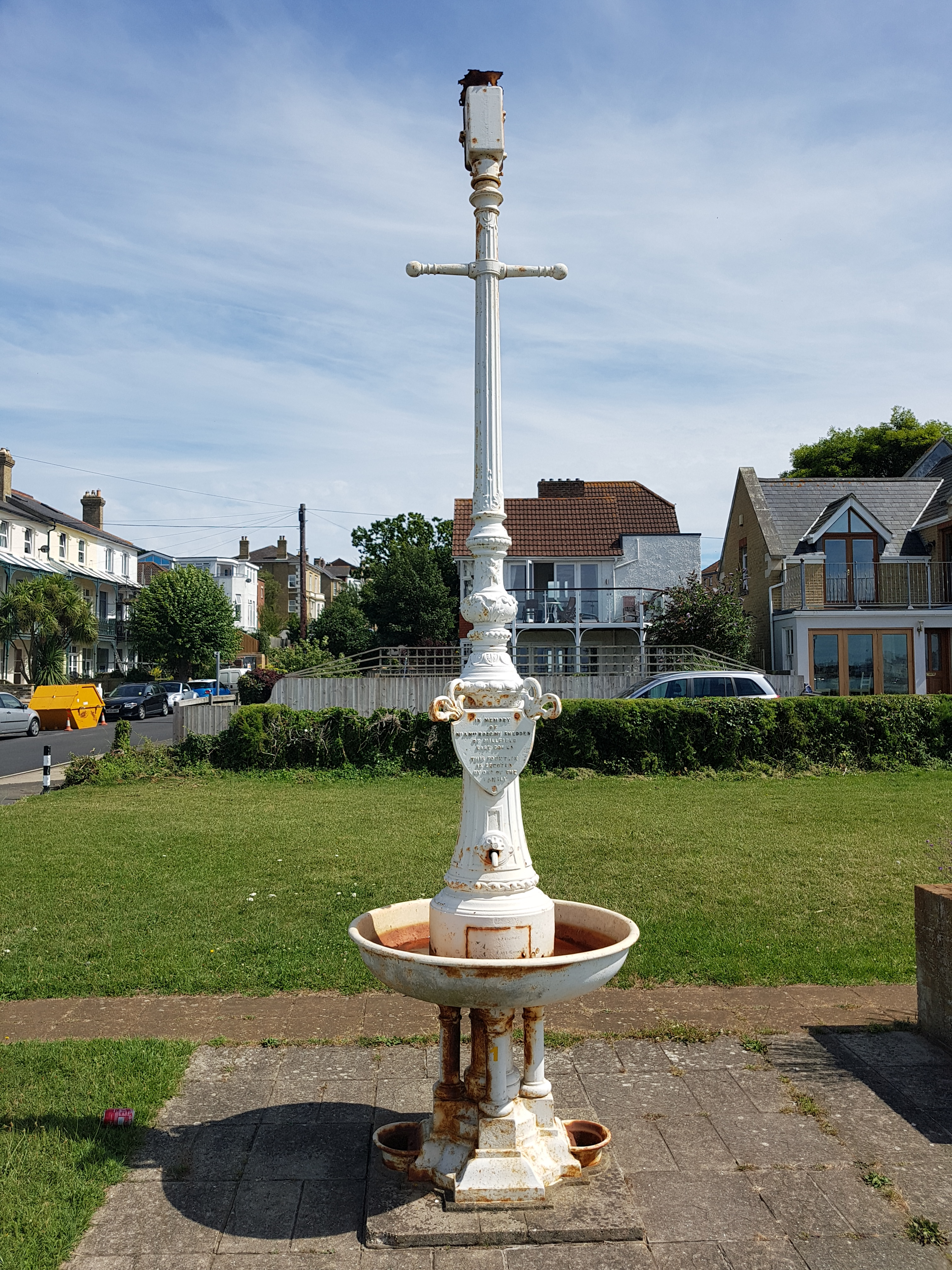
Shedden Memorial

As well as inheriting Spring Hill, Roscow also inherited the family estate in Paulerspury Park, Northamptonshire. He became an important figure in Isle of Wight life, becoming a magistrate. There is a memorial fountain to Roscow and his wife on the Shedden Promenade in East Cowes.

In January 1876, Queen Victoria attended by Princess Beatrice and the Hon. Horatia Stopford, honoured Mrs Shedden with a visit to Spring Hill, whilst on the Isle of Wight.

Roscow was a Justice of the peace. He died in May 1877, aged 66.

=== Sir George Shedden (1877–1937) ===
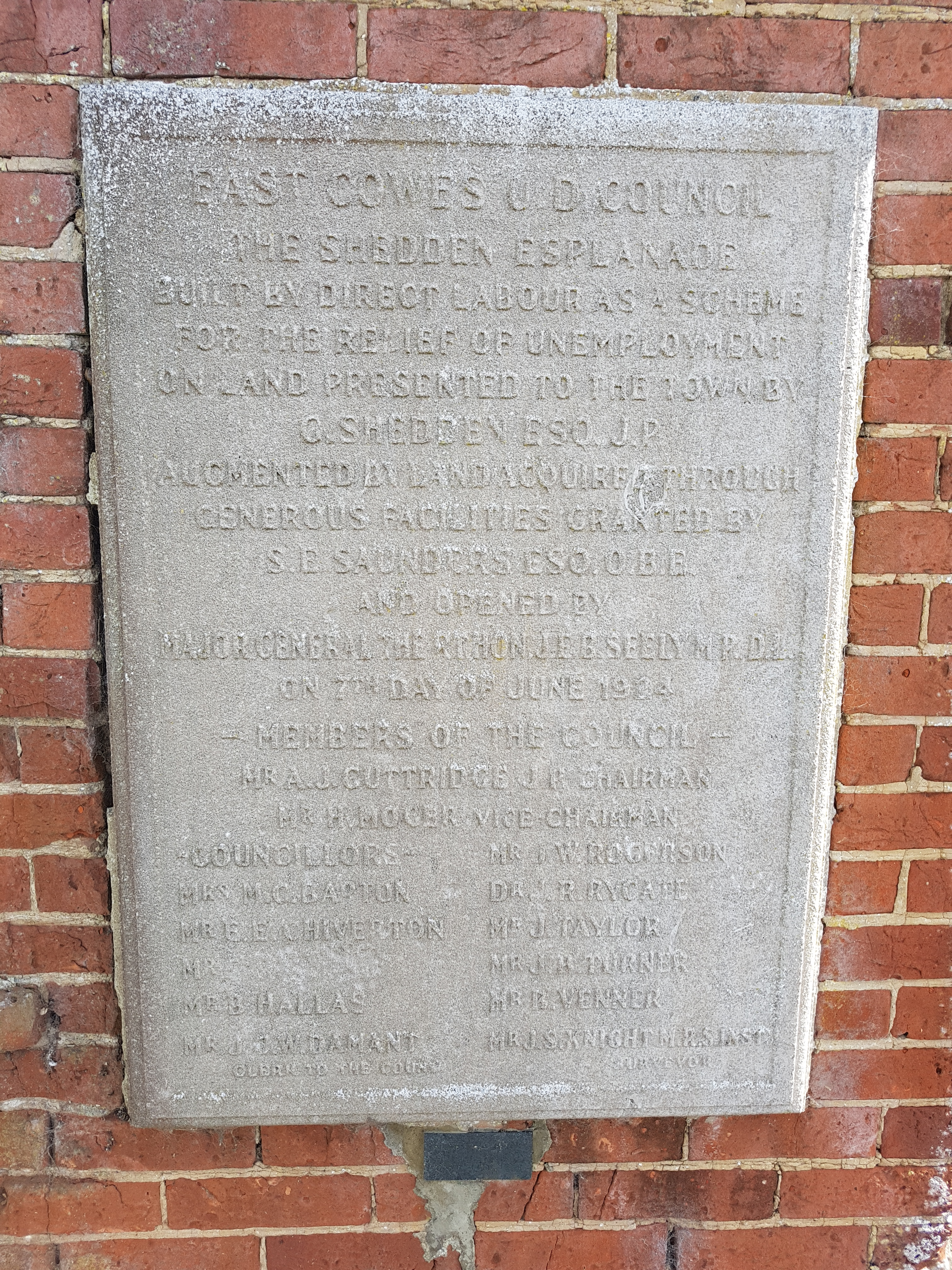
Shedden Plaque

In 1881, following the death of Roscow Cole Shedden's wife, the executors of her will instructed an auction to be held at Spring Hill. Among the lots to be sold were nine dairy cows in calf, two heifers, one bull, one cart horse, three young calves, six pigs, 100 head of poultry, 60 tons of hay, a landau and numerous pieces of farming equipment.

Educated at Cambridge, Sir George was called to the Bar in 1883 as a member of the Inner Temple. He was captain of the Isle of Wight Rifles from 1889 to 1894, commanding the Cowes detachment.

By 1889, Sir George had moved out of Spring Hill into the neighbouring Millfield. Spring hill was by then occupied by Hugo Harpur Crewe, brother of Sir Vauncey Harpur Crewe, 10th Baronet and Lady Harpur Crewe. By 1902, Sir George had returned to Spring Hill.

George Shedden also inherited the estate in Paulerspury Park, as well as that of Spring Hill. However, Paulerspury Park was now much diminished, being of only 590 acres. George sold the farm in 1920 to its sitting tenant.

The large hillside estate of Spring Hill originally ran right down to the shoreline. However, in 1924, George Shedden donated many acres of the shore and its esplanade to the people of East Cowes. It was reported that the long-desired scheme was largely brought about by the extremely generous and public-spirited action of Alderman George Shedden J.P., who munificently gave a valuable portion of his Spring Hill estate, abutting the foreshore. This also had the effect of supporting the Council in their effort to find work for around 200 unemployed men, suffering from the slackness in the shipbuilding industry, following the ending of the Great War. Shedden said that it was a very happy day in his life and that he was thankful to have lived to see what a splendid promenade the District Council had made.

George Shedden also gave to the town a scout hut, which used to be located between St Thomas's and Old Road. The esplanade road, which was opened in 1927 and named ‘The Shedden Espalanade’, is now an invaluable part of daily East Cowes life.

George Shedden was knighted in the 1926 Birthday Honours. He became Deputy Lieutenant of the Isle of Wight and he also acted as the Honorary Treasurer of the Frank James Hospital, in East Cowes, for which Princess Henry of Battenberg was president. He was also Chairman of the Isle of Wight County Justices, a County Alderman, President of the Isle of Wight Conservative Association and a lay Canon of Portsmouth Cathedral. He died at the age of 81 on 14 February 1937, leaving a considerable amount of money in his will. However, it was reported that following his death, Spring Hill House was left abandoned. It is not yet known why his son, Bishop Roscow Shedden, did not inherit the estate, although he spent a lot of time abroad, as the Dean of Christ Church Cathedral in Nassau. He was also Lord of the Manor of Hardmead, Buckinghamshire, which would seem to have been passed down the Shedden line, from the original George Shedden.

One of George Shedden's grandsons, George Powell-Shedden went on to become a decorated war-hero in the RAF and was also an Olympic bobsledder.

=== Wartime years ===
Following the death of Sir George Shedden, it was reported that the estate was sold in May 1938 to Major Arthur Birkbeck of the adjoining Norris Castle estate, effectively merging the two estates together. Spring Hill estate at that time was 80 acres, four times its current size. It would have been bigger still in earlier years, before Sir George Shedden donated many acres of the estate to the people of East Cowes in 1924, to enable them to construct the public promenade.

During World War Two, the estate was requisitioned by the War Office and used as barracks for Canadian troops. As with many requisitioned properties, at the end of the war, it was left in a terrible state of repair. Then, for a short while, it became a Dr Barnardo's children's home. However, even as early May 1946, it was known that the home would be closing down in the near future. It was said that the departure of the children from East Cowes, would signal the end of the 3rd East Cowes Boys Scouts’ Association troop, to which many of the children belonged. There were upwards of 60 boys quartered at Spring Hill, along with ‘Kim’ the institution's pet dog.

In August 1946, after the death of Major Birkbeck, Spring Hill estate was again auctioned, although his widow, Florence retained the remainder of Norris Castle.

=== Convent of the Cross ===
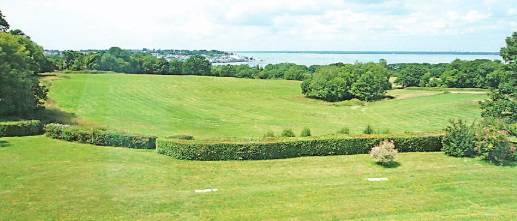
Part of the Spring Hill estate

In 1947, the estate was sold to the Congregation of Holy Cross, a teaching and nursing order and so Spring Hill became known as the Convent of the Cross. At that time it was described as being "a derelict dump in the middle of a hay field" and it took a lot of work to restore it. The convent duly opened, with the nuns moving in on 1 September 1948.

Since then, a chapel has been added to the building and its grounds now contain a small graveyard, where a number of the nuns have been interred.

In 1950, the Holy Cross's Cowes school, which occupied a single room in Terminus Road, was moved to the convent, occupying two of its rooms. At that time, there were twenty four nuns resident in the House. However, by 1953, a separate detached school was built in the estate's grounds, which is still open.

Due to its surroundings and the space of Spring Hill House, the estate became a venue for wedding receptions in the 1990s.

Whilst it remained a convent for almost seventy years, the number of nuns living there gradually dwindled and so the decision was finally made that the estate would have to be sold. When the sale was completed in July 2016, there were just three nuns still living there. They left to go to other communities of the order of the Holy Cross.

=== Uavend (East Cowes) Ltd. ===
Bought by this development company in July 2016, the estate owners are currently in the planning stages of its development. It was sold subject to existing planning use, with two of the buildings having at that time, existing planning permission for alterations to be made, to create two four-bedroom properties.

The adjacent Holy Cross Catholic Primary School, which was built in the grounds in 1953, will be unaffected by the sale and will remain open.
