= Frank James Hospital =

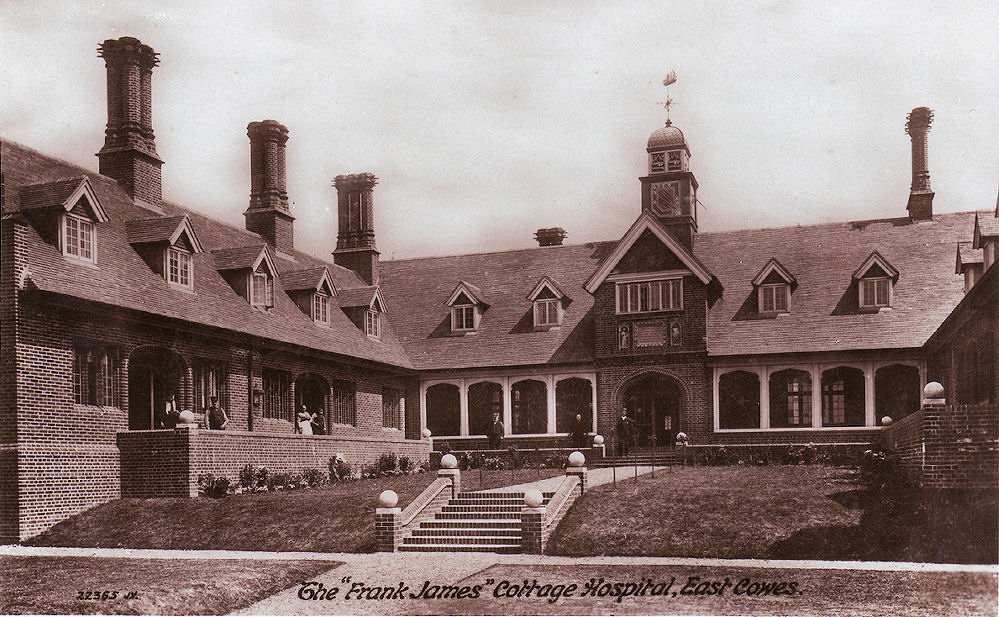
- The hospital when it was known as the Frank James Cottage Hospital

- Shown in Isle of Wight

Geography
- Location: East Cowes, United Kingdom
- Coordinates: 50.75531°N 1.285726°W

Organisation
- Care system: Public NHS
- Type: Home for seamen

Services
- Emergency department: No Accident & Emergency

History
- Founded: 1903
- Closed: 2002

Links
- Lists: Hospitals in the United Kingdom

The Frank James Hospital is a currently closed hospital in Adelaide Grove, East Cowes on the Isle of Wight. It was sold by the NHS Trust in 2002 and since then, it has had ownership issues, which has led to its vandalism and disrepair. The building is currently on the endangered buildings list for the United Kingdom. It has a central block with two projecting wings and a verandah to the ground floor on all sides. It is built of red brick, with a tiled roof and has been Grade II listed since 1979.

The building was constructed in 1893, as a home for retired seamen and was originally called the Frank James Memorial Home. It was commissioned by William and Arthur James as a memorial to their brother, Frank Linsly James, eldest son of the New York entrepreneur Daniel James and his wife Sophia, who ran the British arm of their company Phelps Dodge from Liverpool. The building was designed in a Dutch Style by Somers Clarke.

In 1903, the home was transformed into a cottage hospital, with its running costs paid for by charitable donations. It was eventually absorbed into the National Health Service in 1948, before finally closing in 2002. Between then and now, it has been laying empty and gradually deteriorating.

In March 2012, an action group was formed called the "Friends of Frank James", with the aim of saving and preserving the Frank James Hospital for future generations. They have had the support of Isle of Wight MP Andrew Turner. The group's aim is to push for action, to prevent the building being lost forever.

== The life of Frank James (1851-1890) ==
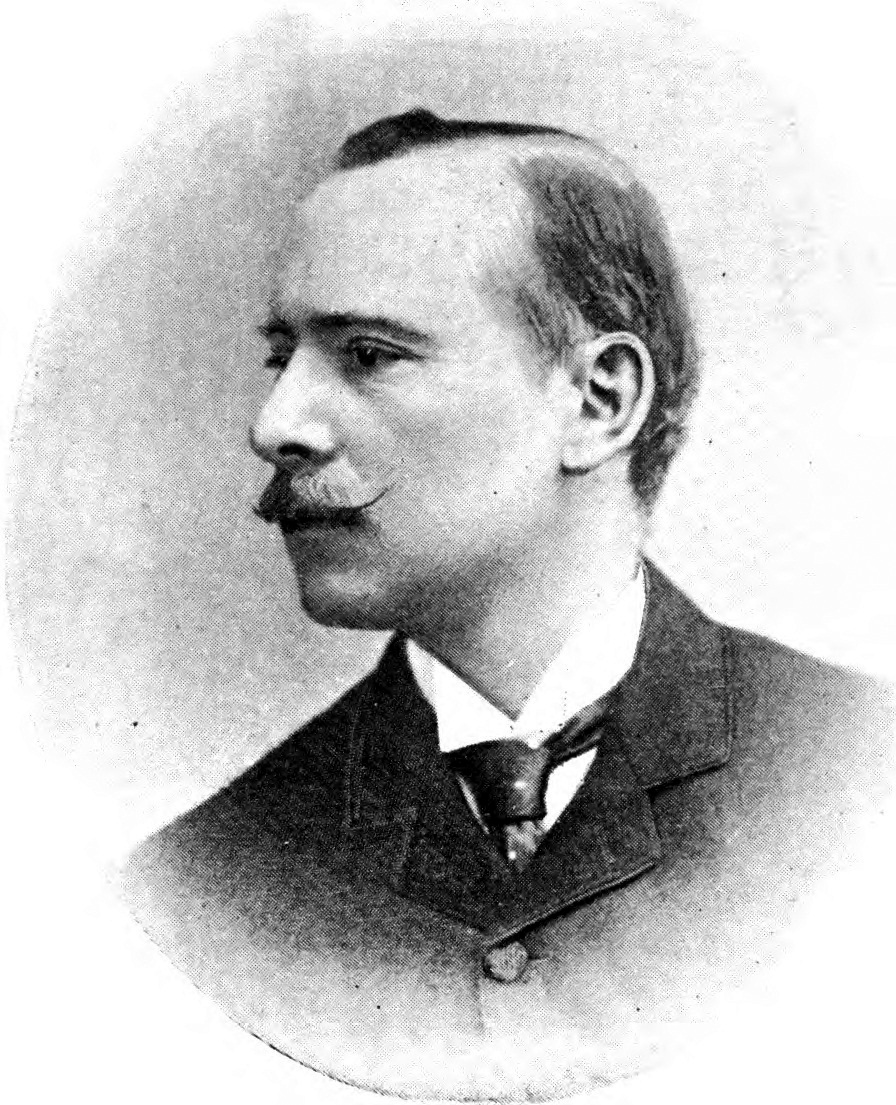
Frank Linsly James, frontispiece from The Unknown Horn of Africa

Frank Linsly James was born in Liverpool in 1851, into an extremely wealthy family, headed by the American businessman Daniel James, who ran the British arm of his company Phelps Dodge from there. Frank later attended Cambridge University and was described as being a universal favourite in London society and a member of many leading societies there.

He went on to become an explorer, adventurer and writer and travelled extensively around Africa on his own yacht The Lancashire Witch, often with his brother William. The Lancashire Witch was a 211 ton, 160 foot, three masted schooner, with auxiliary steam power and a ship's complement of 81. James wrote several books about his experiences.

Frank was ultimately killed in 1890, on his 39th birthday, whilst exploring in San Benito, Gabon, West Africa, this time without his brother. He was attacked by a wounded elephant, whilst out on a "sporting tour", or in other words, big-game hunting. It is thought that Frank fired the shot, which enraged the elephant and he died within an hour of the incident. The tragedy was witnessed by his friend, Mr Ethelbert E Lort Phillips, who himself had a narrow escape from the rampaging elephant. Frank's body was returned to England and he was buried in Kensal Green Cemetery, London. At the funeral were many lords and ladies and other high ranking members of society. These included three Earls, two Viscounts, three Lords, three knights, three Members of Parliament and eight men of high military rank.

Frank James left a considerable sum in his will. The estate, excluding his American holdings, was valued at £100,009 5s 1d. From this, he bequeathed £5,000 each to the Hospital for Incurables at Putney and the Cheyne Hospital for Sick Children at Chelsea. He left a legacy of £500 to the captain of his yacht and a legacy of £10,000 to his friend, Mr Ethelbert E Lort Phillips, together with an annuity to him of £1,200 per year. The remainder of his estate was divided equally between his brothers, William and Arthur James.

His devastated brothers went on to have the Frank James Memorial Home for retired seamen built in 1893, in his honour. The weathervane on top of the building is a model of Frank's yacht, The Lancashire Witch.

Frank's body was ultimately exhumed in 1917 and re-interred in the family plot at West Dean, West Sussex.

== The Frank James Memorial Home for seamen (1893 - 1903) ==
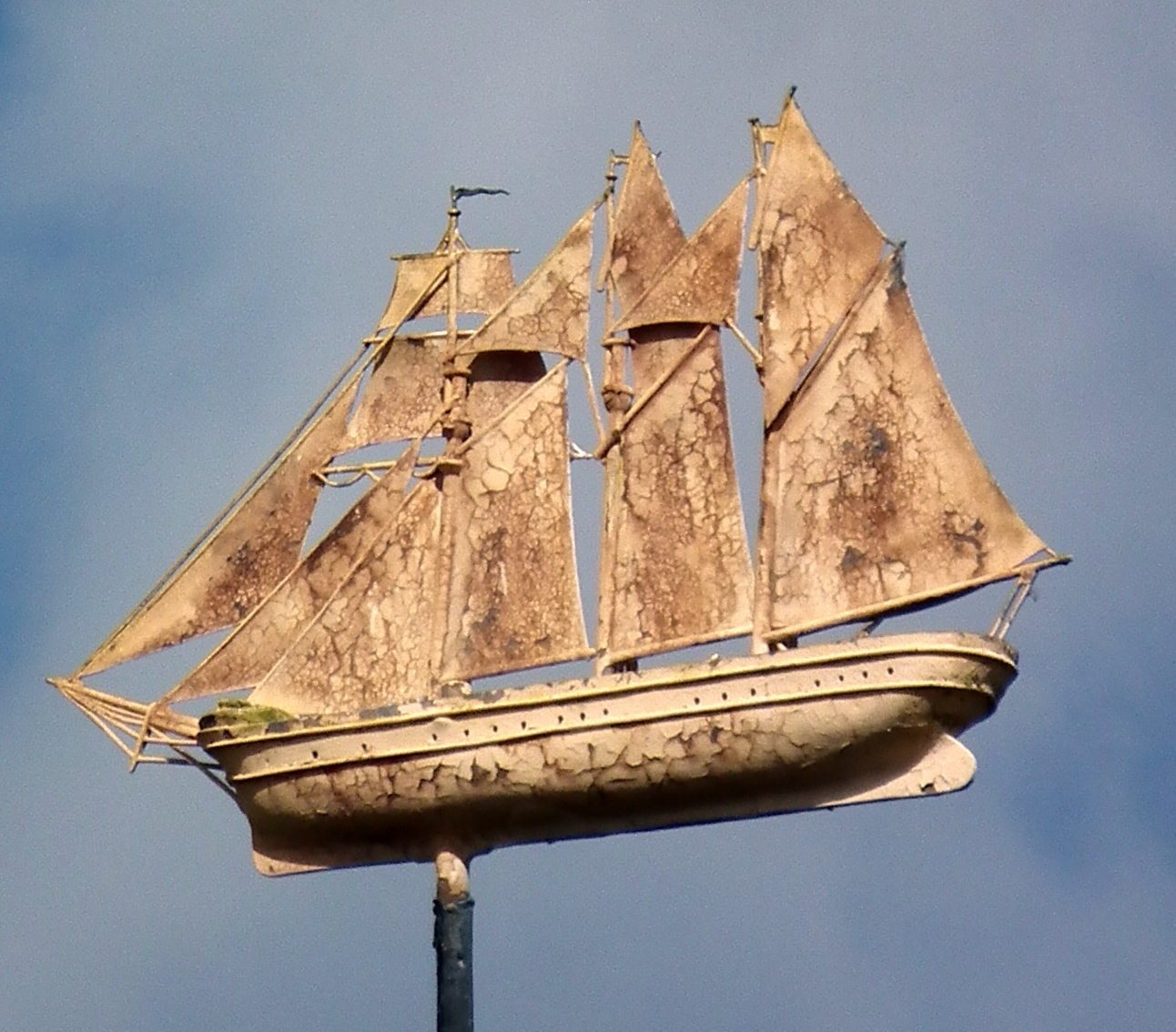
The Lancashire Witch wind vane on the roof

The memorial home was built in 1893 as a home for retired seamen, to commemorate Frank's love for the sea and the men who made their living from it. As well as his brothers, the founders of the home included Lord Scarborough, Lord Yarborough and a Mr Alfred Shuttleworth. Lord Scarborough was an avid sailor and was travelling with Frank in the Gabon, when he was killed.

The original intention was that the home be built in Cowes, in view of Frank's association with the town, as a member of the Royal Yacht Squadron. However, due to the cost of land in Cowes, East Cowes was selected instead.

In February 1894, the Empress Frederick, the eldest child of Queen Victoria visited the home, together with Edward, Prince of Wales. In August of the same year, it was announced that Kaiser Wilhelm, the German Emperor, was expected to visit the home. He was the eldest grandchild of Queen Victoria and the son of the Empress Frederick.

In 1895, the James's asked for the East Cowes District Council's permission to erect a lamp at the entrance gate to the home, with the Council maintaining it afterwards. This request was unanimously adopted, with the Chairman stating that "considering the great outlay of the James family on the institution and the great beauty of the building, he had no doubt that the Council would accede to the request".

Regretfully, "for one reason or another", the home didn't turn out to be as successful as the James's had hoped and so they looked to find alternative, better charitable uses for the building. In 1899, the brothers therefore offered the home to the War Office, as a convalescent home to the wounded soldiers returning from the South African War.

In 1901, they offered its use to the Prince of Wales's Hospital Fund for London. This was so that the Fund could send patients from one of its London hospitals to convalesce there. At the same time, Arthur and William James also undertook to donate an additional £10,000 to the home. The offer was to take effect on the termination of the South African War, when it would be no longer needed by the War Office. It was hoped that after the transfer, the new convalescing patients would be sailors if possible, in line with it originally being a home for retired seamen.

However, this arrangement, if it actually happened at all, did not last for long as in December 1902, it was announced that the Cowes Hospital Committee had accepted another offer of William and Arthur James, that the home and its contents be put at the disposal of Princess Henry of Battenberg, Governor of the Isle of Wight. This was so that the home could be used as a cottage hospital for the towns of Cowes and East Cowes and as a resident home for District and other nurses. This arrangement came about as a result of the Princess contacting the James's, to ask if they would agree to donate the use of the home for this purpose.

== The Frank James Hospital (1903 - 2002) ==
Plaque commemorating Frank James in St Andrew's Church, West Dean, West Sussex, England

For some years, there had been attempts to open a cottage hospital for Cowes and East Cowes, which was badly needed to alleviate the time it took to transport local patients to the Isle of Wight County Hospital in Ryde. However, due to a lack of funds, this scheme had not been possible, even though approximately £900 had been subscribed to the scheme. However, this all changed when the James's made their most generous offer regarding the memorial home.

The Cowes Cottage Hospital Committee on behalf of Princess Henry of Battenberg gratefully accepted the offer, agreeing to the additional terms therein. These being that the name of the hospital remain as a memorial to Frank James and that after two years, the hospital be given as a free gift to Cowes and East Cowes, together with an endowment of £10,000, providing that the James's were satisfied with the way that the hospital was being managed and supported. The James's gift of £10,000 was designed to give the hospital a clear income of £300 per year. The full hand-over of the hospital was made in January 1906.

The hospital was duly opened on 18 June 1903 by the Princess of Battenberg herself, on a warm day in the summer sun. A red carpet had been laid out for her, down the steps and to the outer gate, where the Princess's carriage drew up. At the time of opening, it was announced that the hospital's running costs of approximately £750 per year, were to be very generously supported by J. S. White & Co and their workforce of over 2000 men, who promised a large annual subscription. Other local firms also followed suit. A considerable sum of money had been spent on converting the home into a hospital, including the fitting out of an operating theatre, together with all the most modern equipment and surgical appliances. The hospital was designed to accommodate eight patients, although more than double that could be taken, if funds were to allow it.

A week earlier, the hospital had received its first casualty, a Cardiff man who had received severe injuries after falling from a scaffold. He was reported to be doing well. Another early admission was in August 1903, when a lad by the name of Mark Cosh from Mark's Corner was treated at the hospital after being shot with a pistol by another lad. He was said to be in a precarious condition.

It was reported in 1922, that King George V had given a subscription of £5 to the hospital.

Princess Henry long-continued her association with the hospital and its work. In 1930, she presided at the annual meeting of the Frank James Memorial Home, for which she still acted as President. In 1938, a new wing, known as the King George V Memorial Wing, was added to the hospital and also a new 'Ear, nose and throat' department.

In July 1946, following the death of Princess Henry of Battenberg, the governors of the hospital elected Irene Mountbatten, Marchioness of Carisbrooke, as the new President. Her husband, Alexander Mountbatten, 1st Marquess of Carisbrooke was Princess Henry's eldest child.

In 1948, a Gurnard man was awarded £3,018 in damages for severe burns, sustained whilst undergoing a minor operation at the hospital. He was put into a bed which contained a hot water bottle, whilst still under anaesthetic and suffered the burns to his back.

Also in 1948, the hospital became state-funded for the first time, rather than relying on charitable donations, after the formation of the National Health Service, which took over control of the hospital. In 1991, a major renovation of the hospital was undertaken, converting the now large wards into smaller rooms. The hospital re-opened as a community hospital in April 1992, after a £200,000 facelift.

It then carried on as an NHS hospital until 30 July 2002, when it closed for the last time. The reason given for its closure was that current methods of healthcare, with an emphasis on quality as well as cost effectiveness, meant that the type of building now needed for patient care was very different from that of the nineteenth century, when Frank James was built. The hospital was ultimately too small and too old-fashioned. The remaining patients were relocated to the refurbished Newcroft building at St Mary's Hospital.

== Dereliction (2002 - 2017) ==
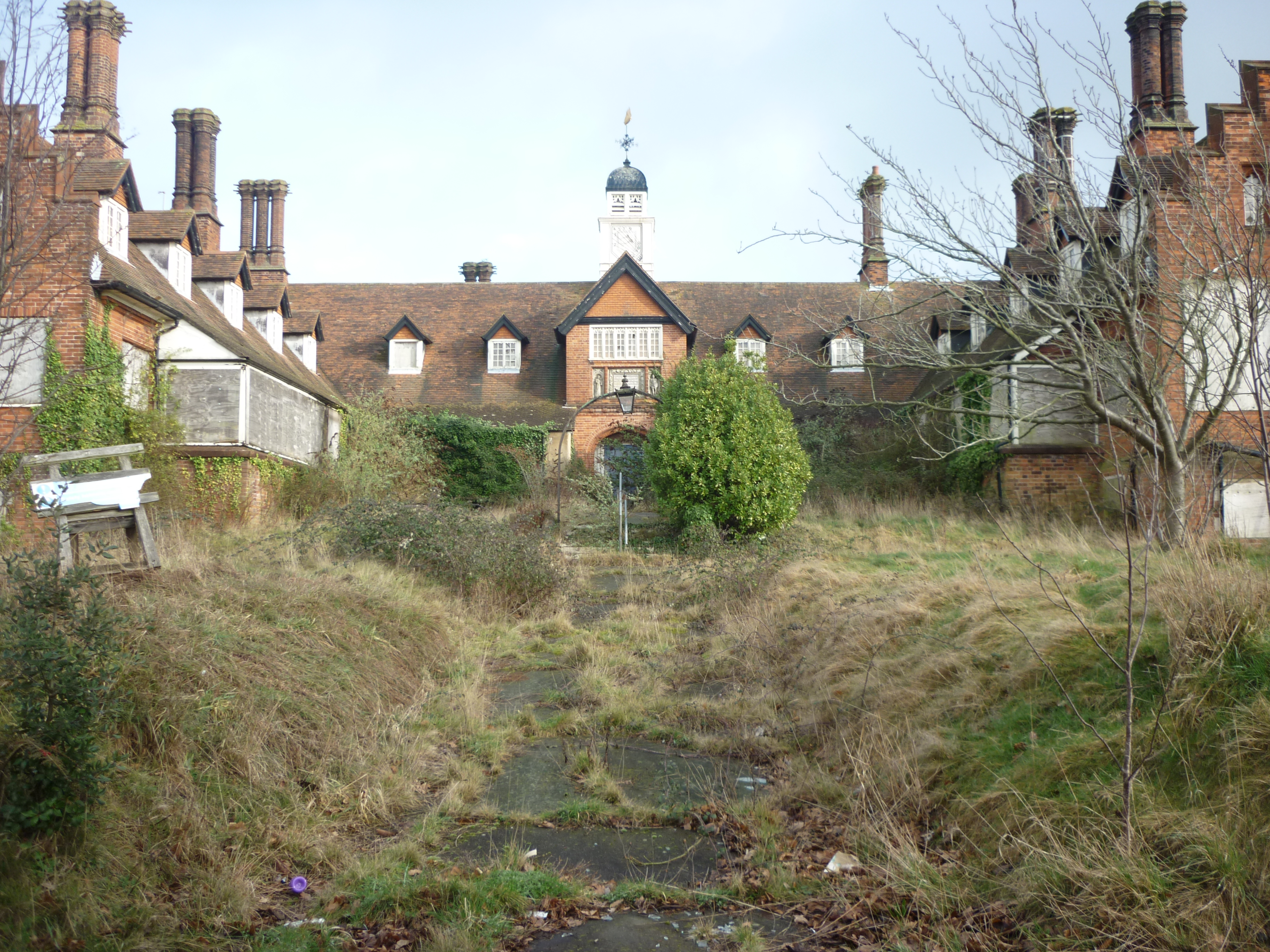
In a derelict state, 2010.

In 2003, the NHS sold the building to the highest bidder, a developer who planned to convert the hospital into eleven units of accommodation and a terrace of town houses. In 2004, the King George V Memorial Wing, which had been added in 1938, was demolished to make way for the town houses. In 2005, work commenced to divide the building into the eleven proposed apartments. And in January 2006, the Isle of Wight Council planning department approved an application for Listed Building Consent, by the owners Vivaldi Property Managegment Limited.

However, due to ongoing legal, ownership and funding issues, work stopped there for some eleven years, leaving the building to fall into a bad state of disrepair and an ongoing target for vandalism. Damage to the roof, windows, and guttering meant that for a long period, the building wasn't weather proof. In 2007, the Council issued an Urgent Works notice to the owners, which demanded that they carry out repairs. As no satisfactory repairs were made, the Council carried out this work themselves and billed the owners. The bill was never paid and was ultimately written off as a bad debt. In 2014, another Urgent Works notice was issued to the nine registered owners of the building. Urgent Works were finally carried out in 2015, to repair these parts of the building.

In September 2014, a new planning application was submitted to the Isle of Wight Council by the then owners, Southsea based company Charlemaine Estates LTD. This was to create an additional eight units, with the aim of achieving greater value, to enable the building to be developed; and to protect the existing structure. The application was approved in July 2015.

In April 2017, the site owners started clearing the grounds, to prepare for the new development to start. This included cutting down some of the trees on site, to make way for a car park. The Friends of Frank James said that some of the trees had been replanted in the community and a small number left on the site for future enjoyment. The developers are to build seventeen flats, some within the remaining building and some to the side of it.

== Friends of Frank James ==
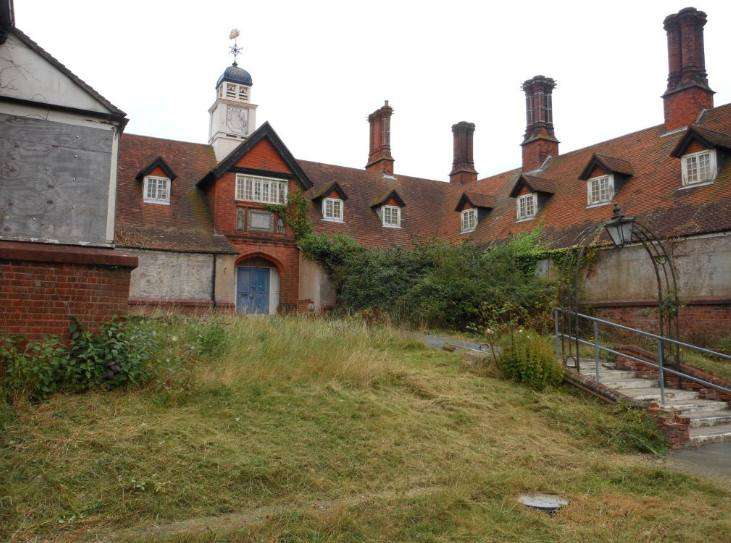
The hospital in 2012, after a 'clean-up'.

The action group, 'Friends of Frank James', was founded in March 2012, when a group of like-minded residents decided to band together, to do their best to save the hospital. They met monthly, to tend to the grounds and to keep the Frank James Hospital in the spotlight, in an attempt to preserve it for future generations. They were often described as a 'Guerilla Force' and as 'Guerilla Gardeners', tending to the gardens around the site. To prevent the building from continuously deteriorating over the years if in-action, they also helped to open up communications between the Council and the owners. They have had the support of Island MP, Andrew Turner and the TV presenter, Alan Titchmarsh, who was formerly High Sheriff of the Isle of Wight.

In March 2017, the group were refusing to hand over the keys to the hospital to its owners, until the developers agreed to a date to start work on its restoration and conversion. The owners had previously said that the work would start in October 2016, which failed to materialise. Assurances were also being sought as to the fate of the trees within the grounds.

Later that month, the group held a celebration to commemorate five years of working to preserve the site. Hundreds of people attended, although the owners did not, despite being invited. On 15 March 2017, the keys to the hospital were given to the owners in an 'emotional handover', with a pledge being given that work would start very soon. The owners had also given assurances that some of the fruit trees planted by the volunteers would be retained, whilst others would be safely removed to make way for a car park.
