= Hoe =

Hoe or HOE may refer to:

- Hoe (food), a Korean dish of raw fish
- Hoe (letter), a Georgian letter
- Hoe (tool), a hand tool used in gardening and farming
  - Hoe-farming, a term for primitive forms of agriculture
- Backhoe, a piece of excavating equipment
- HOE, pharmaceutical compound number prefix for Hoechst AG

== People ==
- James Hoe, American academic
- Richard March Hoe (1812–1886), American inventor
- Robert Hoe (machinist) (1784–1833), English-born American businessman, the father of Richard Hoe
- Robert Hoe III (1839–1909), American businessman, the grandson of Robert Hoe

== Places ==
- Ban Huoeisay Airport, in Laos
- Hoe, Norfolk, a village in Norfolk, England, United Kingdom
- Homerville Airport, in Georgia, United States
- Plymouth Hoe, a public space in Plymouth, England, United Kingdom

== Media ==
- Heroes Over Europe, a video game
- "Hoe", a 2014 song by Kirko Bangz
- "H.O.E. (Heaven on Earth)", a song by Yo Gotti from the 2020 album Untrapped
- "Happiness Over Everything (H.O.E.), a song by Jhené Aiko the 2020 album Chilombo

== Other uses ==
- H0e scale, in model railroading
- Holographic optical element
- Horom language, spoken in Nigeria
- R. Hoe & Company, a manufacturer of printing presses
- USS Hoe (SS-258), a U.S. Navy submarine from World War II
- Homing Overlay Experiment, a project in the Strategic Defense Initiative
- Hoe (occupation), someone engaging in prostitution
- Hoes (surname)

== See also ==
- Ho (disambiguation)
