= Robert Hoe =

Robert Hoe may refer to:

- Robert Hoe (machinist) (1784–1833), English-born master carpenter and machinist in the United States, sole proprietor of R. Hoe & Company
  - R. Hoe & Company, a New York City-based printing press manufacturer
- Robert Hoe III (1839–1909), American businessman and producer of printing press equipment
- Robert Hoe Jr. (1922–1983), American entrepreneur, philanthropist, and band enthusiast
