= Printer's Park =

Public park in the Bronx, New York

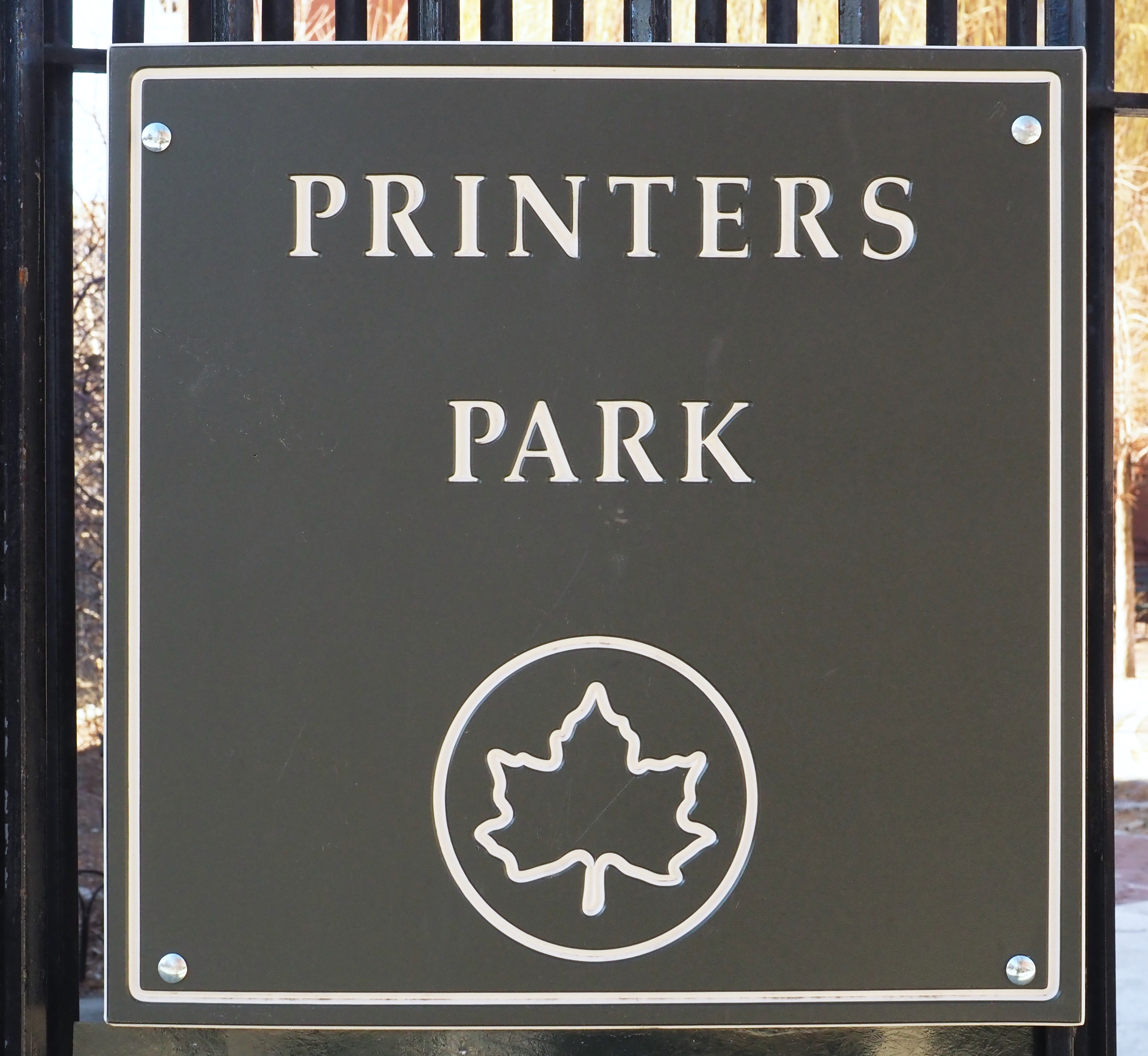
- Sign at park entrance (missing apostrophie)
- Interactive map of Printer's Park
- Type: Municipal park
- Location: Longwood, The Bronx, New York
- Coordinates: 40.8236444°N 73.8908065°W
- Area: 1.34 acres (0.54 ha)
- Opened: 2001 (renovated)
- Owner: New York City Department of Parks and Recreation
- Status: open all year
- Website: www.nycgovparks.org/parks/printers-park

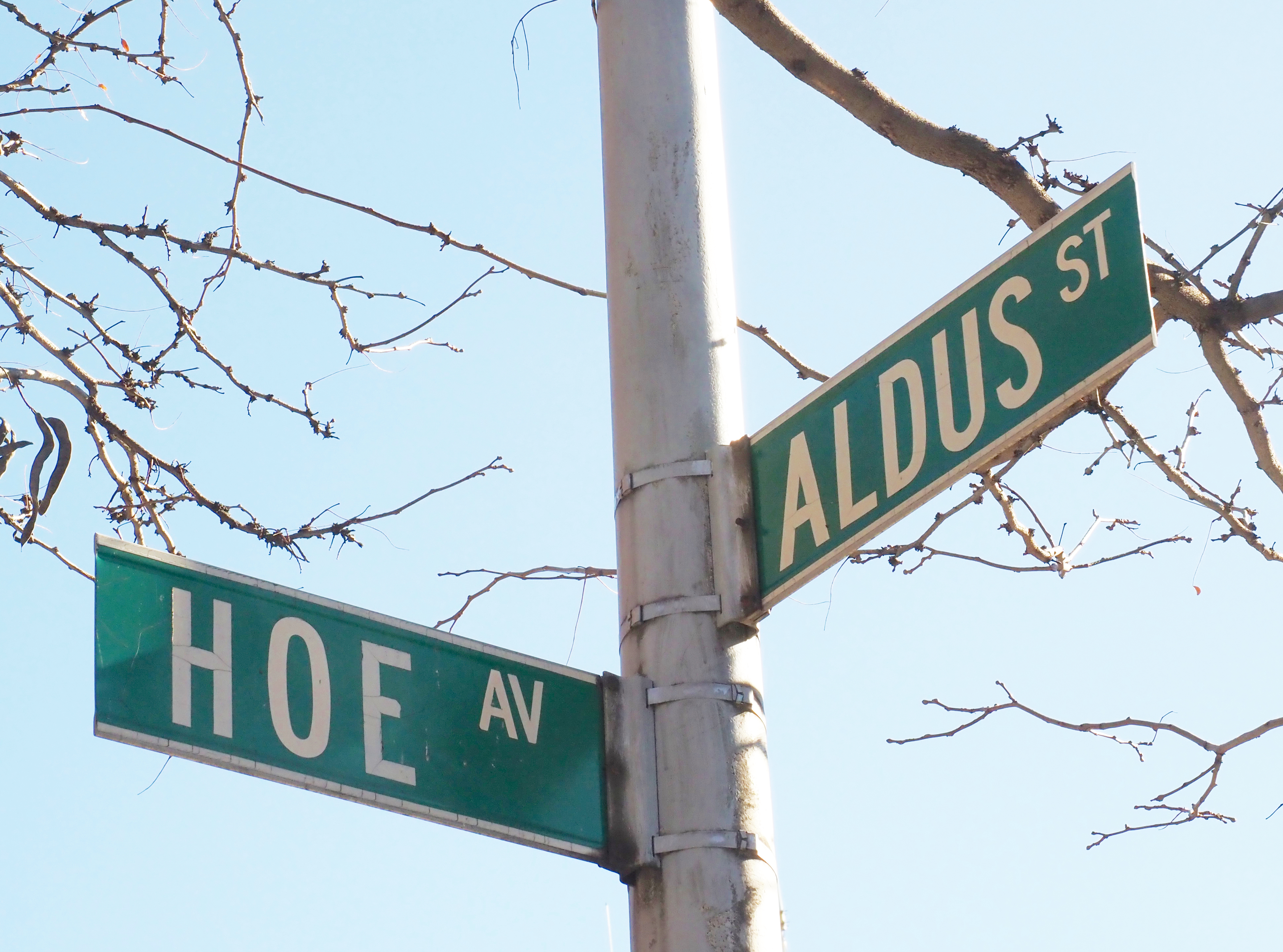
Street signs by park entrance

Printer's Park (spelled Printers Park by some sources) is a small park on Hoe Avenue between Aldus Street and Westchester Avenue, in the Longwood neighborhood of the Bronx, New York City. The park is run by the New York City Department of Parks and Recreation (NYC Parks).

The park's name (and the street it lies on) honors Richard March Hoe, who invented the Rotary printing press. The land the park occupies was once part of Hoe's family estate. The cross-street, Aldus Street, is named after Aldus Manutius, a 15th-century printer.

NYC Parks acquired the site in 1997. The northern portion of the park was renovated in 2001; the name was changed to Printer's Park at that time. In 2009, the southern portion of the park was reconstructed at a cost of $1 million, and the park was officially reopened on July 29, 2010. (Note: Sources variously state $1 million or $100 million as the renovation cost. The larger figure is believed to be in error.) The renovation included play structures reminiscent of the printing press heritage.

== Gallery ==
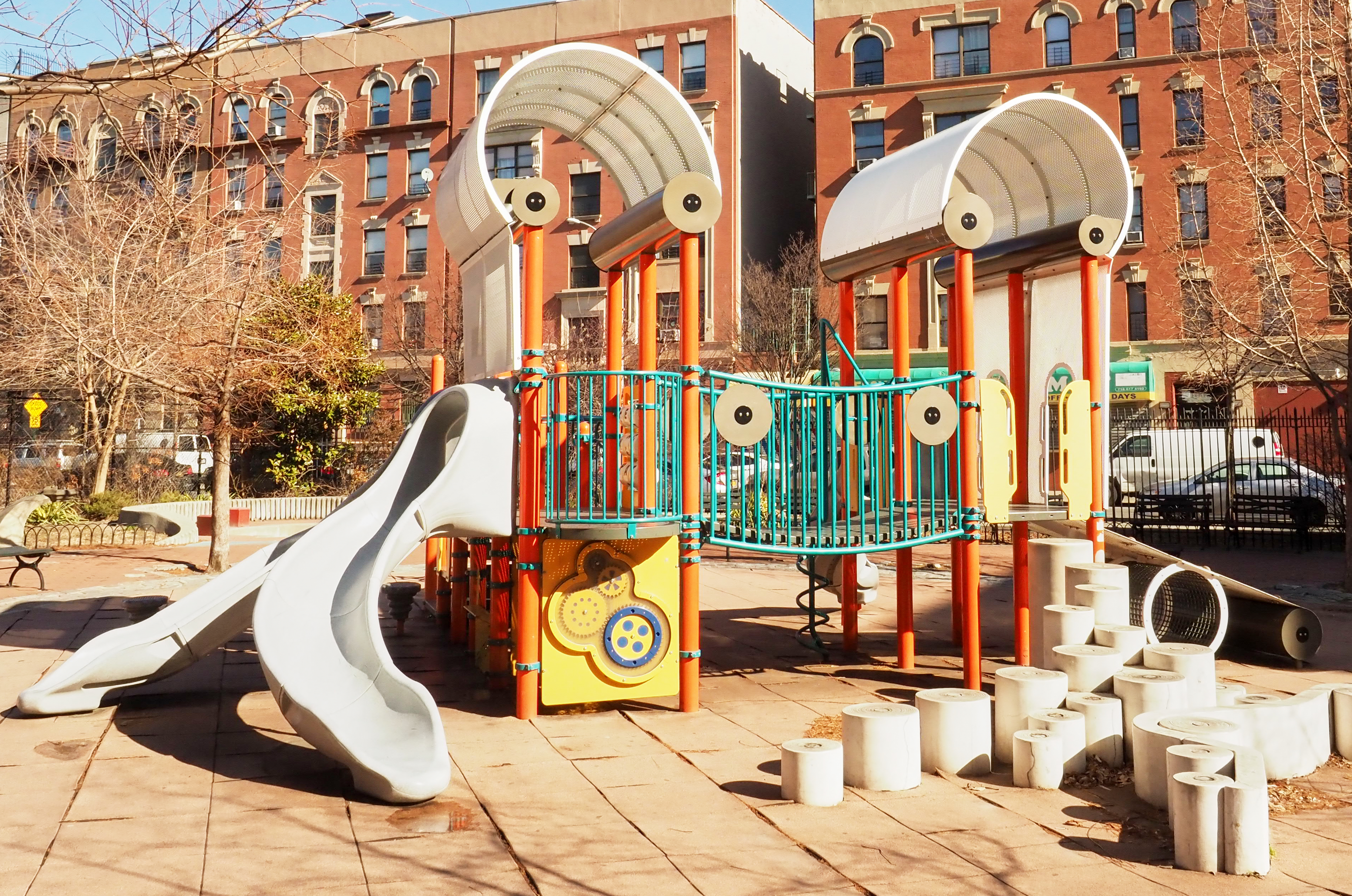
Metal play structure.

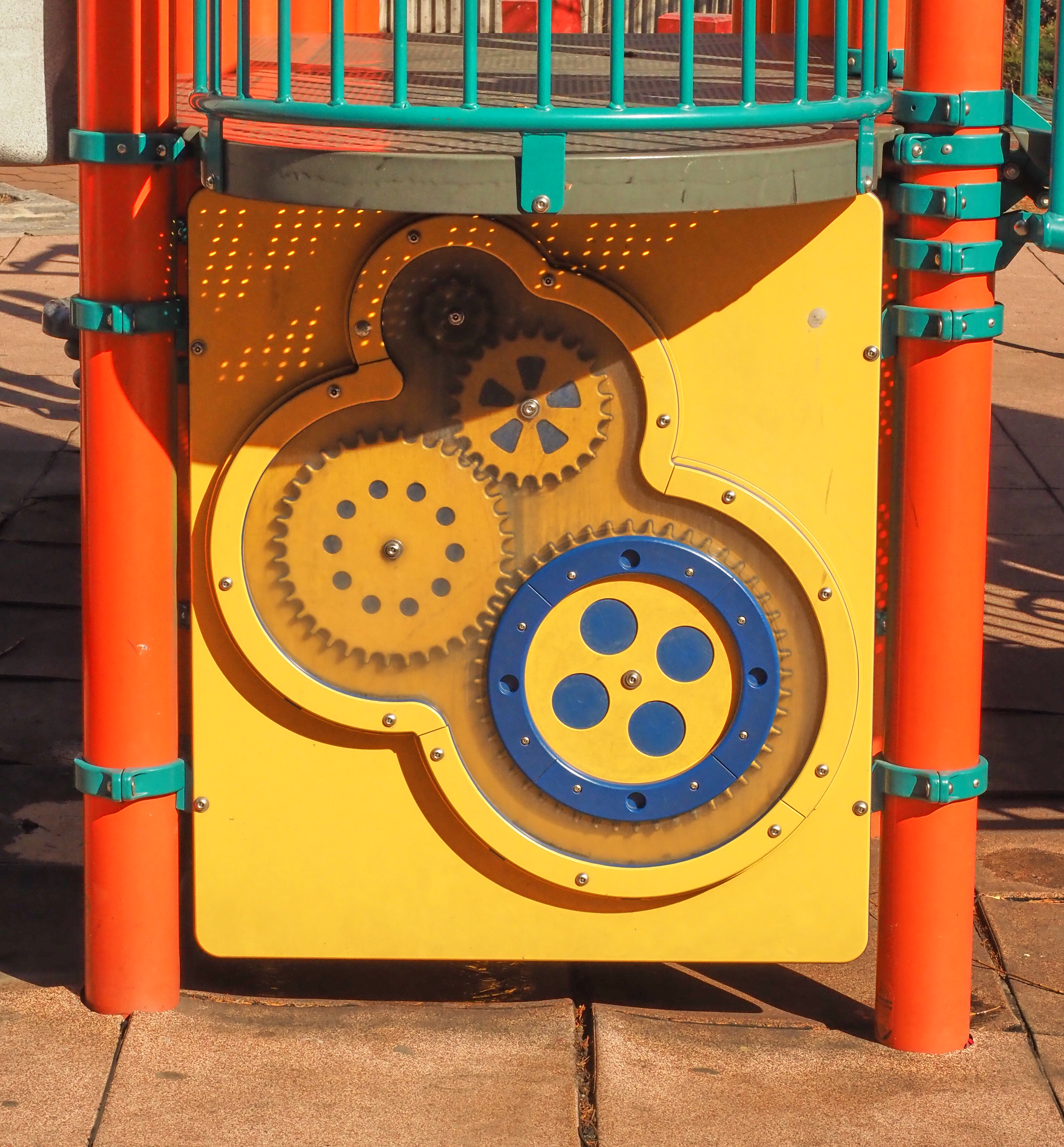
Detail of play structure showing gear motif.

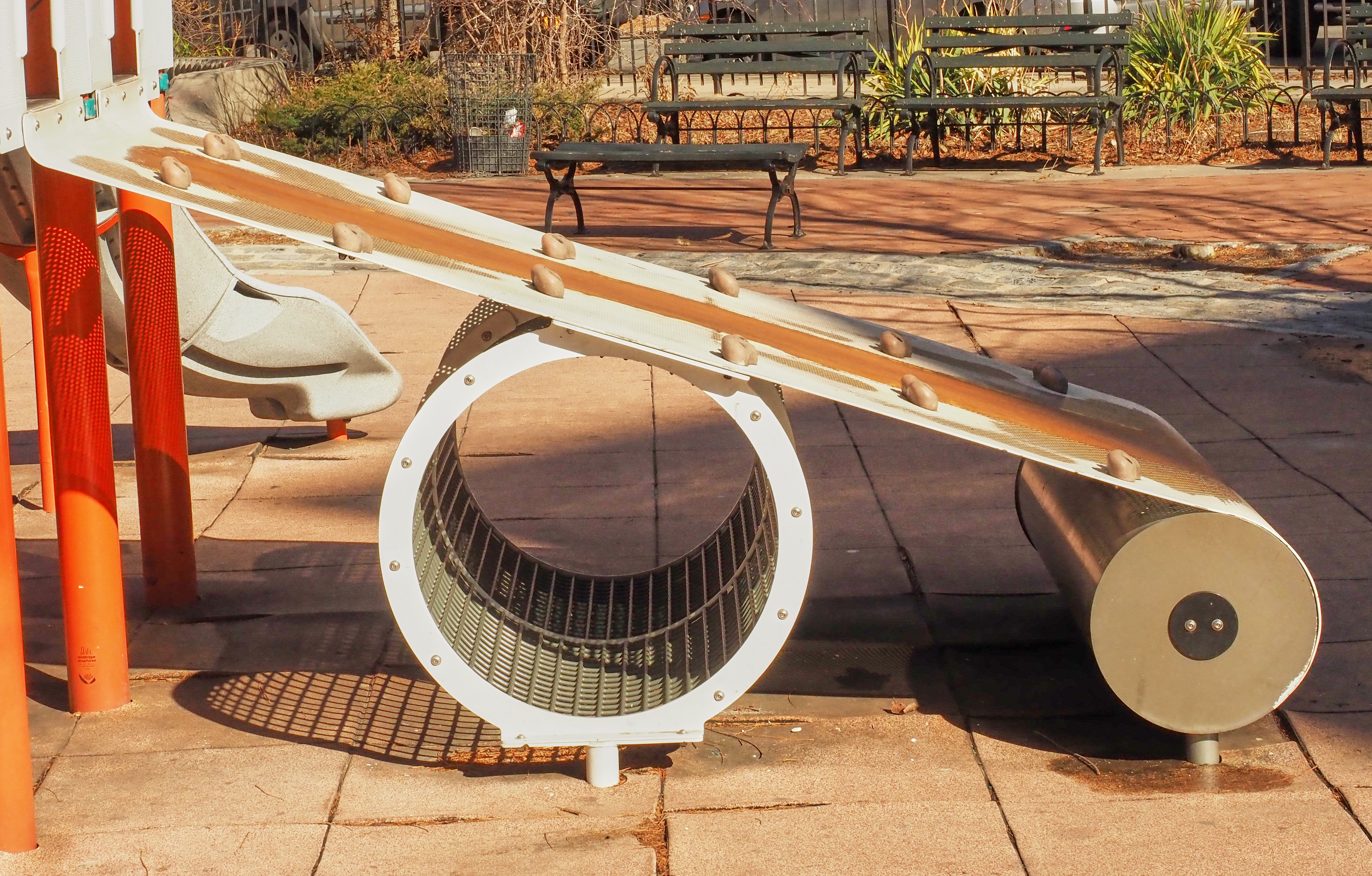
Detail of play structure showing press-roller motif.

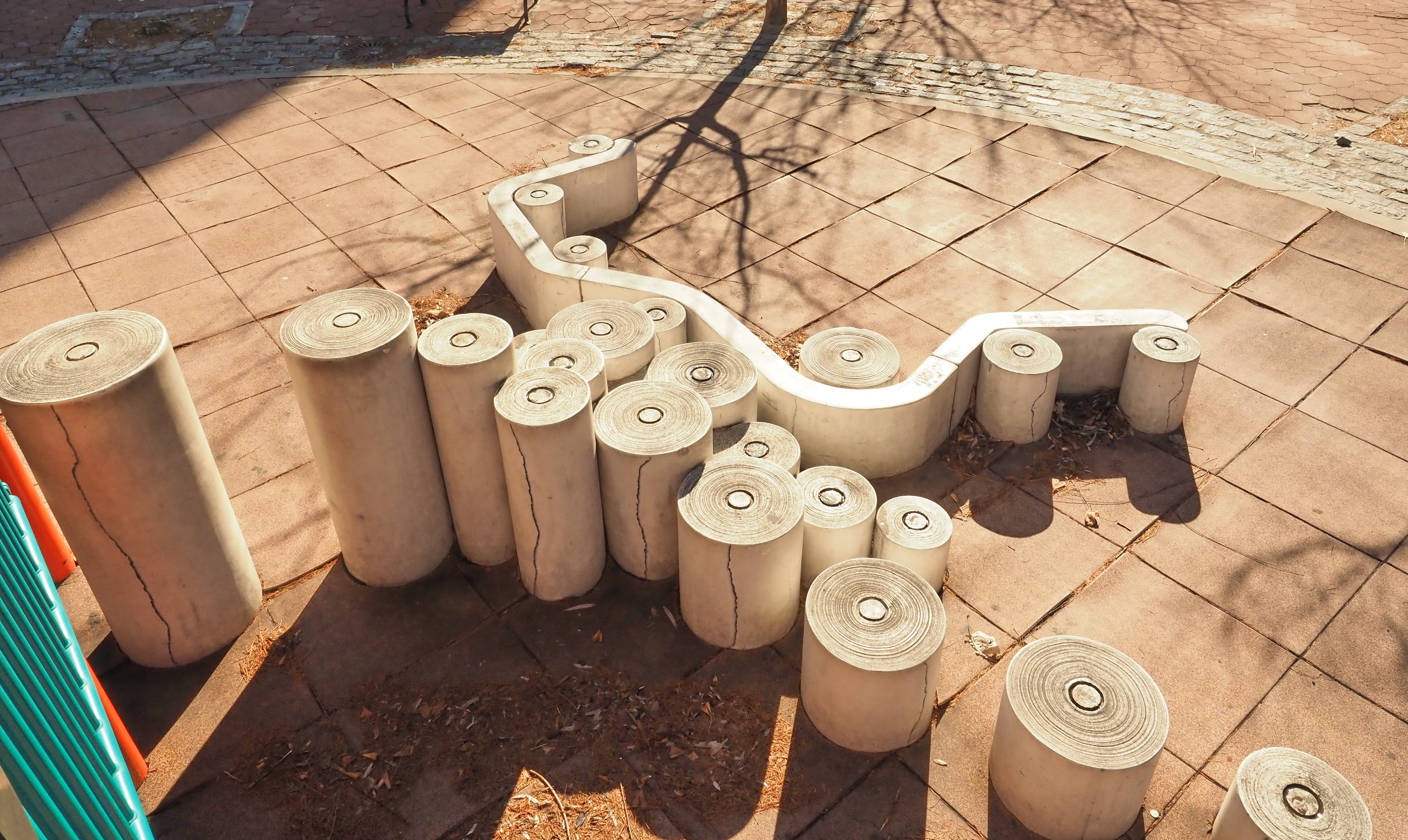
Play structure designed to look like paper going over the rollers in a printing press.
