= Public Ledger (Philadelphia) =

1836–1942 daily newspaper published in Pennsylvania

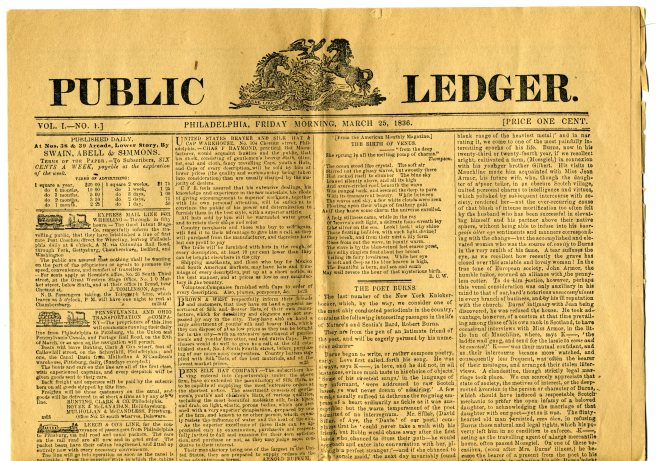
- The newspaper's first edition on March 25, 1836
- Type: Daily newspaper
- Format: Broadsheet
- Founder(s): William Moseley Swain, Arunah S. Abell, Azariah H. Simmons
- Founded: March 25, 1836; 190 years ago
- Ceased publication: January 1942; 84 years ago
- Political alignment: Republican
- Language: English
- Headquarters: Philadelphia, Pennsylvania, U.S.

The Public Ledger was a daily newspaper in Philadelphia, Pennsylvania, published from March 25, 1836, to January 1942. Its motto was "Virtue, Liberty, and Independence". It was Philadelphia's most widely-circulated newspaper for a period, but its circulation began declining in the mid-1930s. The newspaper also operated a syndicate, the Ledger Syndicate, from 1915 until 1946.

== History ==
=== 19th century ===
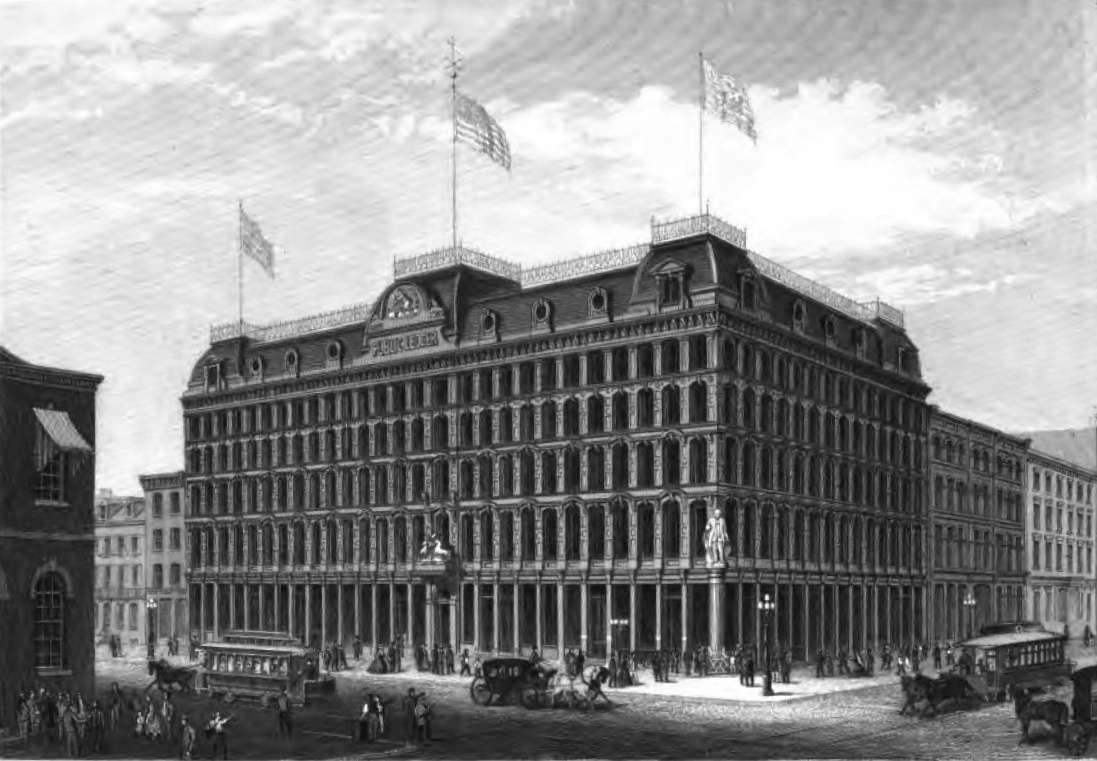
The Public Ledger Building at 6th and Chestnut Streets in Center City Philadelphia, designed by John McArthur Jr., built in 1867, and demolished in 1920

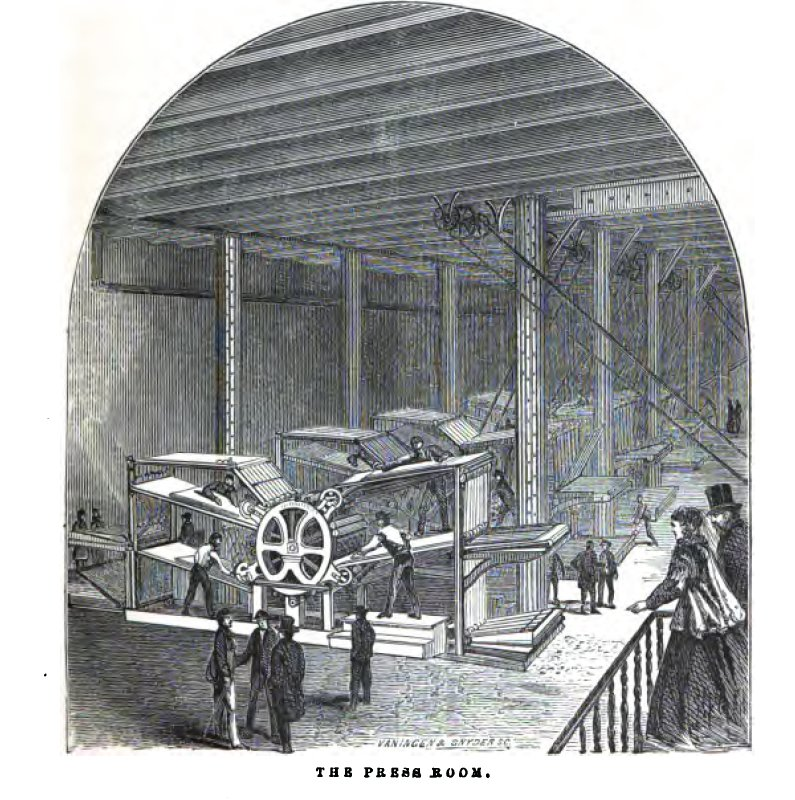
The press room of the Public Ledger in 1867

The Public Ledger was founded by William Moseley Swain, Arunah S. Abell, and Azariah H. Simmons, and edited by Swain. It was the first penny paper in Philadelphia. At the time, most newspapers sold for five cents (equal to $1.47 today) or more, a relatively high price which limited their appeal to readers who were reasonably well-off.

Swain and Abell drew on the success of the New York Herald, one of the first penny papers and decided to use a one cent cover price to appeal to a broad audience. They mimicked the Herald's use of bold headlines to draw sales. The formula was a success and the Public Ledger posted a circulation of 15,000 in 1840, growing to 40,000 a decade later. To put this into perspective, the entire circulation of all newspapers in Philadelphia was estimated at only 8,000 when the Public Ledger was founded.

The Public Ledger favored the abolition of slavery, and in 1838 its office was threatened by a pro-slavery mob, two days after the same pro-slavery group burned down the new Pennsylvania Hall (Philadelphia).

The Public Ledger was a technological innovator as well. It was the first daily to make use of a pony express, and among the first papers to use the electromagnetic telegraph. From 1846, it was printed on the first rotary printing press.

By the early 1860s, The Ledger was a money-losing operation, squeezed by rising paper and printing costs. It had lost circulation by supporting the Copperhead Policy of opposing the American Civil War and advocating an immediate peace settlement with the Confederate States of America. Most readers in Philadelphia at the time supported the Union, although there was a strong contingent of Confederate sympathizers and families with ties to the South, since many Southerners maintained second homes in Philadelphia and sent their daughters to finishing schools there.

In the face of declining circulation, publishers were reluctant to increase the one-cent subscription cost, although it was needed to cover the costs of production. In December 1864, the paper was sold to George William Childs and Anthony J. Drexel for a reported $20,000 (equal to $411,702 today).

After acquiring the Public Ledger, Childs changed the newspaper's policies and operations. He changed the editorial policy to support the Union, raised advertising rates, and doubled the cover price to two cents. After an initial drop, circulation rebounded and the paper resumed profitability. Childs was closely involved in all operations of the paper, from the press room to the composing room. He intentionally upgraded the quality of advertisements appearing in the publication to suit a higher-end readership.

Childs's efforts bore fruit and the Public Ledger became one of the most influential journals in the country. Circulation growth led the firm to outgrow its facilities; in 1866 Childs bought property at Sixth and Chestnut Streets in Philadelphia, where the Public Ledger Building was constructed. Designed by John McArthur Jr., the building had at its corner a larger-than-life-sized statue of Benjamin Franklin by Joseph A. Bailly (1825–1883), which Childs had commissioned.

The quality and profitability of the Ledger improved dramatically. By 1894, The New York Times described it as "...the finest newspaper office in the country." Toward the end of Child's leadership, the Ledger was estimated to generate profits of approximately $500,000 per year.

In 1870, Mark Twain mocked the Ledger for its rhyming obituaries, in a piece entitled "Post-Mortem Poetry", in his column for The Galaxy:

There is an element about some poetry which is able to make even physical suffering and death cheerful things to contemplate and consummations to be desired.

=== 20th century ===
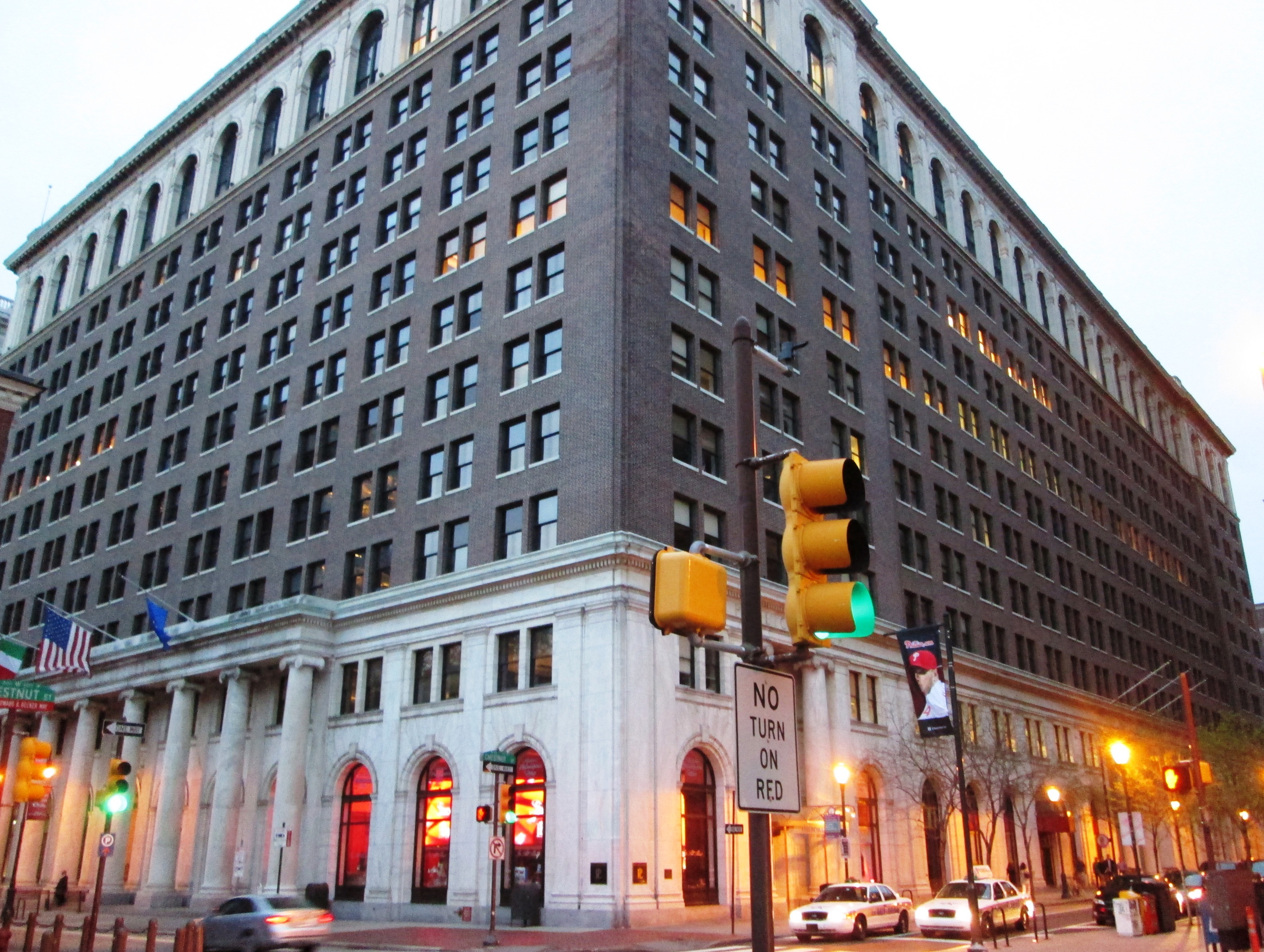
The Public Ledger Building in 2024

In 1902, Adolph Ochs, owner of The New York Times, bought the paper from George W. Childs Drexel for a reported $2.25 million. He merged it with the Philadelphia Times (which he had bought the previous year), and installed his brother George Oakes as editor. Oakes served as editor until 1914, two years after Curtis bought the publication.

In 1913, Cyrus H. K. Curtis purchased the paper from Ochs for $2 million and hired his step son-in-law John Charles Martin as editor.

Curtis also owned Ladies' Home Journal and The Saturday Evening Post. His intention was to establish the Public Ledger as Philadelphia's premier newspaper, which he achieved by buying and closing competing newspapers in the city at the time, including the Philadelphia Evening Telegraph, the Philadelphia North American, and The Philadelphia Press.

In 1900, Philadelphia had 13 newspapers.

Under Curtis' ownership, the Public Ledger had a conservative aesthetic appearance. It avoided bold headlines and seldom printed photographs on its front page. Its conservative format has been compared to the contemporary present style of The Wall Street Journal and The New York Times. Curtis built the Public Ledger's foreign news service and syndicated it to other papers through the Ledger Syndicate.

From 1918 through 1921, former U.S. president William Howard Taft was on the newspaper's staff as an editorial contributor. In 1914, seeking to broaden its market and compete against The Evening Bulletin, Curtis began publishing the Evening Public Ledger, a bolder paper designed to appeal to a broader public.

The Public Ledger suffered by competition from The Evening Bulletin, an ascendant newspaper published by William L. McLean, which grew from 12 pages in 1900 to 28 pages in 1920, and from circulation of 6,000 to a leadership position of over 500,000 readers in the same time. The Bulletin's bolder and more commercial approach attracted additional advertising, which in turn drew more readers. Advertising, which comprised only one-third of the Bulletin in 1900, grew to nearly three-fourths of its pages in 1920. At the same time, the circulation at the Public Ledger stagnated.

In 1924, Curtis built a new Public Ledger Building on the same site as its prior building, which was designed by Horace Trumbauer and built in Georgian Revival style.

Throughout the 1920s and prior to the Great Depression, the Public Ledger was profitable. But with the Great Depression's onset, circulation fell in half and profits disappeared. Some observers criticized the newspaper for an indistinct editorial policy, which they contend may have alienated readers. On the one hand, it endorsed reform politicians; on the other hand, the newspaper was decidedly anti-labor. The newspaper ran anti-union advertisements during the 1919 Amalgamated Clothing Workers of America strike, and ran no advertisements supporting the strike.

In 1930, despite the circulation slump caused by the Great Depression, Curtis expanded by buying The Philadelphia Inquirer for $18 million, but he did not consolidate the two newspapers. When he died in 1933, Cutis was estimated to have lost $30 million on his newspaper ventures, with little to show for the investment.

In 1934, the Public Ledger was absorbed into the Inquirer, and management was assumed by John C. Martin, son-in-law of Curtis' second wife. Martin became general manager of Curtis-Martin Newspapers.

On April 16, 1934, the morning and Sunday editions were merged into The Philadelphia Inquirer, which were also owned by Curtis' heirs. The Evening Public Ledger continued to be published independently.

In 1939, John Martin was forced out of the management of the Evening Ledger, and control was assumed by Cary W. Bok, Curtis's younger grandson. Bok spent two years unsuccessfully trying to make the newspaper profitable. In 1941, the Evening Public Ledger was sold to Robert Cresswell, formerly of the New York Herald Tribune. Mounting debts led to a court-ordered liquidation of the newspaper, which ceased publication in January 1942.

== Controversy ==
=== "The Protocols of the Elders of Zion" and Bolshevism ===
On October 27 and October 28, 1919, the Public Ledger published excerpts from the first English-language translation of The Protocols of the Elders of Zion. The article was headlined "Red Bible", and the newspaper published the excerpts from The Protocols, a text proposing the existence of a Jewish plot to take over the world, After removing all references to the purported Jewish authorship of it, The Protocols was recast as a Bolshevist manifesto. Carl W. Ackerman, who wrote the articles, was later appointed head of the journalism department at Columbia University.

== Awards ==
In 1931, a Public Ledger reporter, Hubert Renfro Knickerbocker, was awarded a Pulitzer Prize for a series of articles he authored on the Five Year Plan of the former Soviet Union.

== Editors ==
- Joel Cook
- William M. Swain
- William Henry Fry (1844–1846)
- George Oakes
- Randolph Marshall (1918)
- Charles Munro Morrison (1930–1939, 1941)
- John McLaughlin
- Tiny Maxwell
- Ellis Paxson Oberholtzer
- John Dwyer
- John Chambers

== See also ==
- Charles Henry Sykes, Evening Ledger cartoonist from 1914 to 1942
- Edward Robins, Dramatic and Music editor from 1884 to 1897
- List of defunct newspapers of the United States
