= William Moseley Swain =

American journalist

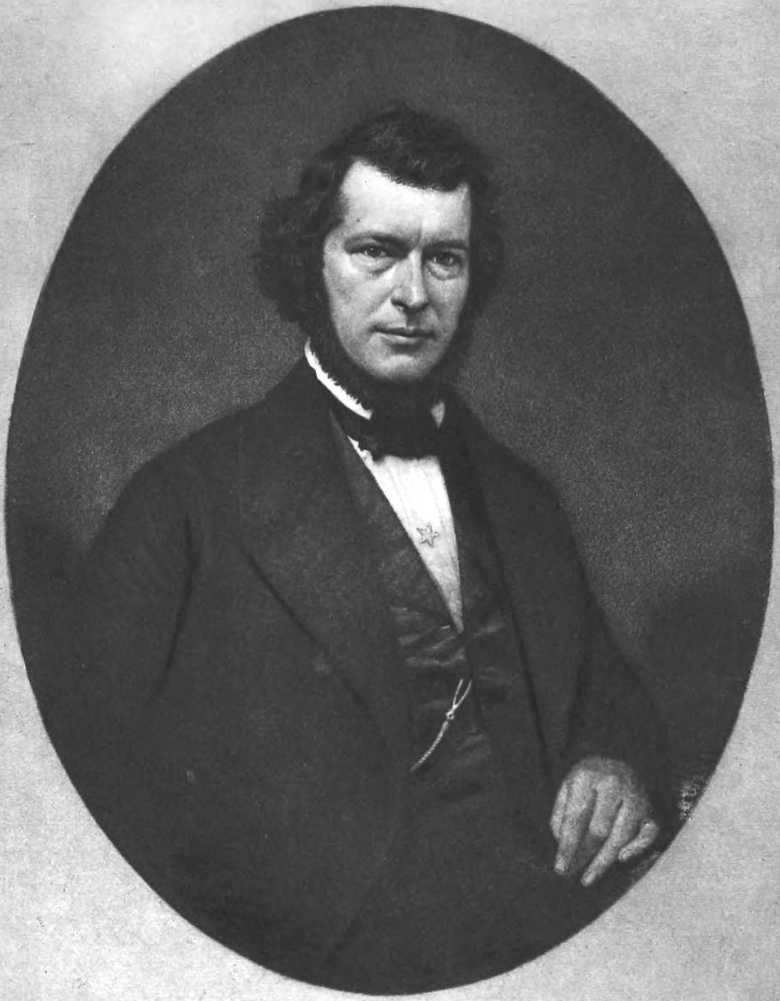
- Born: May 12, 1809; Manlius, New York
- Died: February 16, 1868 (aged 58); Philadelphia, Pennsylvania
- Burial place: The Woodlands Cemetery
- Occupations: Journalist, publisher, editor
- Spouse: Sarah James (m. 1837)
- Children: 5

William Moseley Swain (May 12, 1809 – February 16, 1868) was an American newspaper owner, journalist, publisher, editor, and businessman.

== Early life and career ==
William Moseley Swain was born in Manlius, New York in 1809.

In 1836, along with Arunah Shepherdson Abell and Azariah H. Simmons, he established a daily newspaper in Philadelphia, The Public Ledger. He also served as its editor.

The paper was the first daily to establish a pony-express-style delivery service during the late 1830s and through the next few decades for routing its reporter/correspondent dispatches from throughout the eastern states.

The system was made famous twenty-five years later, in 1861, by the United States Post Office Department, with a series of riders and horses across the Western United States from Missouri to California, at the same time of the construction of the Western Union telegraph line, coast to coast.

The Ledger and its younger sister paper, The Sun of Baltimore, which was established a year later by both Abell and Swain, were two of the first publications to use the new electric telegraph that was invented by their friend, former artist/painter Samuel F. B. Morse (1791–1872). Using Morse code, the system was first tested in 1844 on a line between Baltimore and Washington. That transmission was sent from a telegraph set that was located in the Baltimore and Ohio Railroad's old first main terminal station on Pratt Street in Baltimore's waterfront district to the Supreme Court chambers on Capitol Hill, forty miles southwest.

Three years later, both The Sun and The Ledger made extensive use of the new revolutionary quick communications system to transmit news of the events and battles of the Mexican–American War (1847–1848), thousands of miles southwest as hostilities extended into the capital of Mexico City.

In 1847, the Philadelphia Public Ledger was printed on the first rotary press ever built.

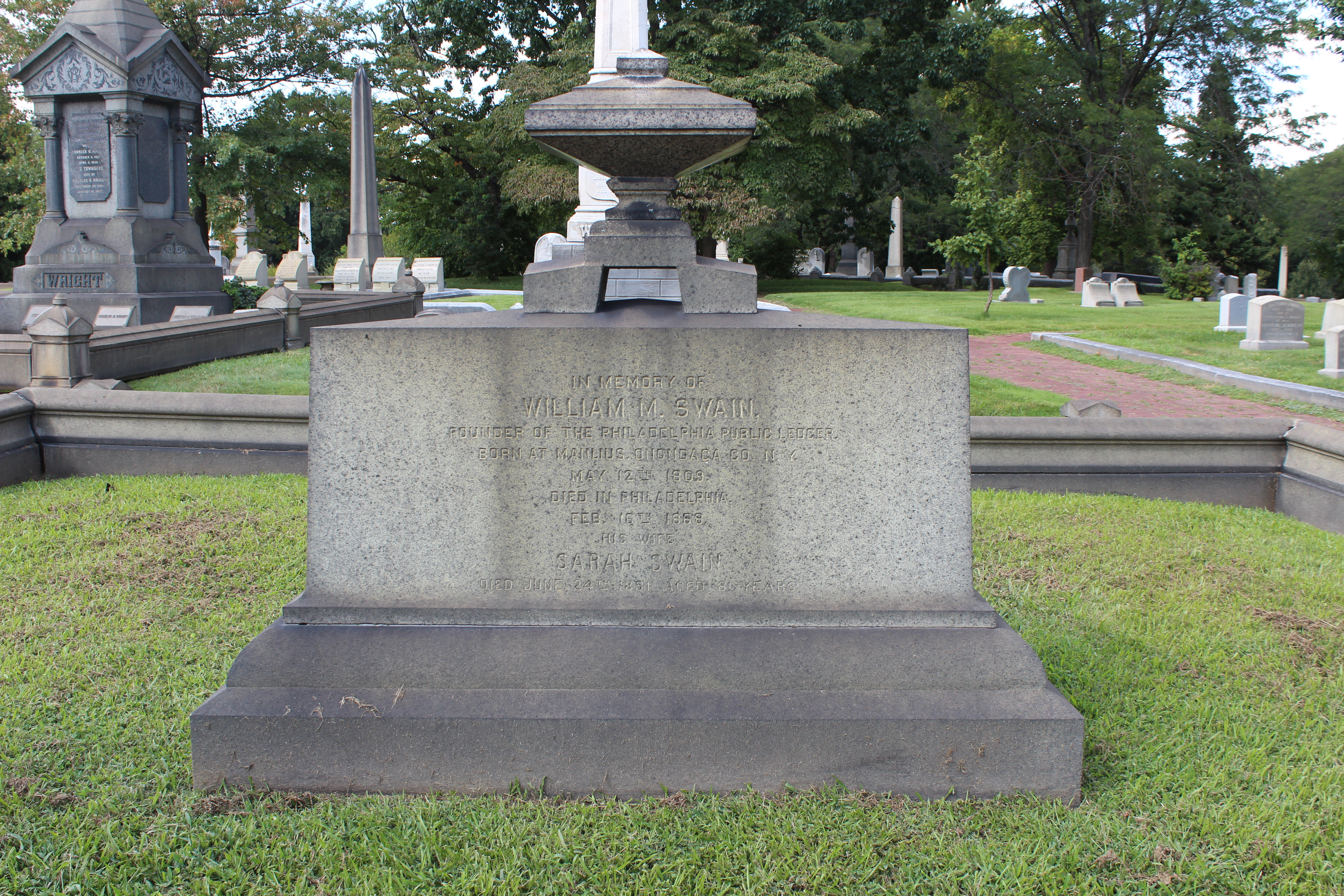
William Swain Memorial in The Woodlands Cemetery

Swain, who had become one of the incorporators of the pioneering Magnetic Telegraph Company in 1845, served as its president beginning in 1850.

== Personal life ==
He married Sarah James on November 19, 1837, and they had five children.

Swain died at his home in Philadelphia on February 16, 1868, and was buried in The Woodlands Cemetery.

His son William J. Swain founded a newspaper titled The Public Record in 1870, which later became The Philadelphia Record.
