= Edward Robins =

American writer

- Born: March 2, 1862; Pau, France
- Died: May 21, 1943 (aged 81); Philadelphia, PA
- Occupations: Writer, Antiquarian, Historian
- Spouse: Julia Stockton

Edward Robins (2 March 1862 – 22 May 1943) was an American newspaperman, author of fiction and non-fiction for both adults and juveniles, antiquarian, and historian. Robins was the 14th president of the Historical Society of Pennsylvania.

== Life ==
Robins was born in Pau, France. He was an only child; his parents were Gertrude Fisher and Edward Robins, a member of the Philadelphia Stock Exchange. Robins was educated in Philadelphia at the Broad Street Military College (sometimes referred to as "institute" or "academy"; it no longer exists).

Robins' initial career was as a journalist. He began in 1883 in Kansas City, but in 1884 he started anew with the Philadelphia Public Ledger, where he remained until 1897, ultimately holding the position of Dramatic and Music editor. He left newspaper work to pursue literary interests and to devote himself to activities of the Historical Society of Pennsylvania.

== Works ==
- Echoes of the Playhouse (1895)
- Benjamin Franklin (1896)
- The Palmy Days of Nance Oldfield (1898)
- Twelve Great Sctors and Twelve Great Actresses (1900)
- Romances of Early America (1902)
- Life of Gen. William T. Sherman (1905)

=== Juveniles ===
- A Boy in Early Virginia
- Chasing An Iron Horse
- With Thomas in Tennessee
- With Washington in Braddock's Campaign
