= Robert Hoe (machinist) =

British-American carpenter and machinist

- Born: 29 October 1784; Hose, Leicestershire, England
- Died: 4 January 1833 (aged 48)
- Children: Peter Smith Hoe; Robert Hoe; Richard March Hoe
- Engineering career
- Projects: printing-press

Robert Hoe (1784–1833), born in Hose, Leicestershire, England, was a master carpenter and machinist in the United States, to which he emigrated in 1803. In 1823 he became sole proprietor of the R. Hoe & Company, retiring in 1832. A skilled mechanic, he constructed and introduced the original Hoe press and was, it is thought, the earliest American machinist to utilize steam as a motive power in his plant.

== Family ==
He was born in the village of Hose in Leicestershire, England. His parents were Richard Hoe and Ann March. He was the father of Peter Smith Hoe (1821 - 1902; who resided at Sunnyslope), Richard March Hoe (1812-1886) and Robert Hoe (1815-1884). Richard became an inventor, developing the rotary printing press, which revolutionized newspaper publishing. Robert II (19 July 1815 New York City - 13 September 1884 Tarrytown, New York) was associated with his father and elder brother Richard in business. He was one of the founders of the National Academy of Design, and a patron of young artists. His son Robert Hoe III became President of R. Hoe Printers upon his father's death. He was also well known as one of the foremost bibliophiles in the country at the time. His book collection and much of his art was sold by the American Art Association in 1911 for $2 million in sales, at the time a record.
