= Robert Hoe Jr. =

American entrepreneur and band enthusiast

Robert Hoe Jr. [V] (January 15, 1922 – February 16, 1983) was an American entrepreneur, philanthropist, and band enthusiast.

== Early life ==
Hoe was born on January 15, 1922, the descendant of presidents of R. Hoe & Company. He attended Pomona College, graduating in 1943.

== Career ==
Hoe was the president of an architectural woodworking firm for more than two decades. He subsequently owned a chain of bowling alleys.

== Musical activities ==
Hoe amassed one of the most extensive collections of band scores ever compiled.
