= Arunah Shepherdson Abell =

American publisher (1806–1888)

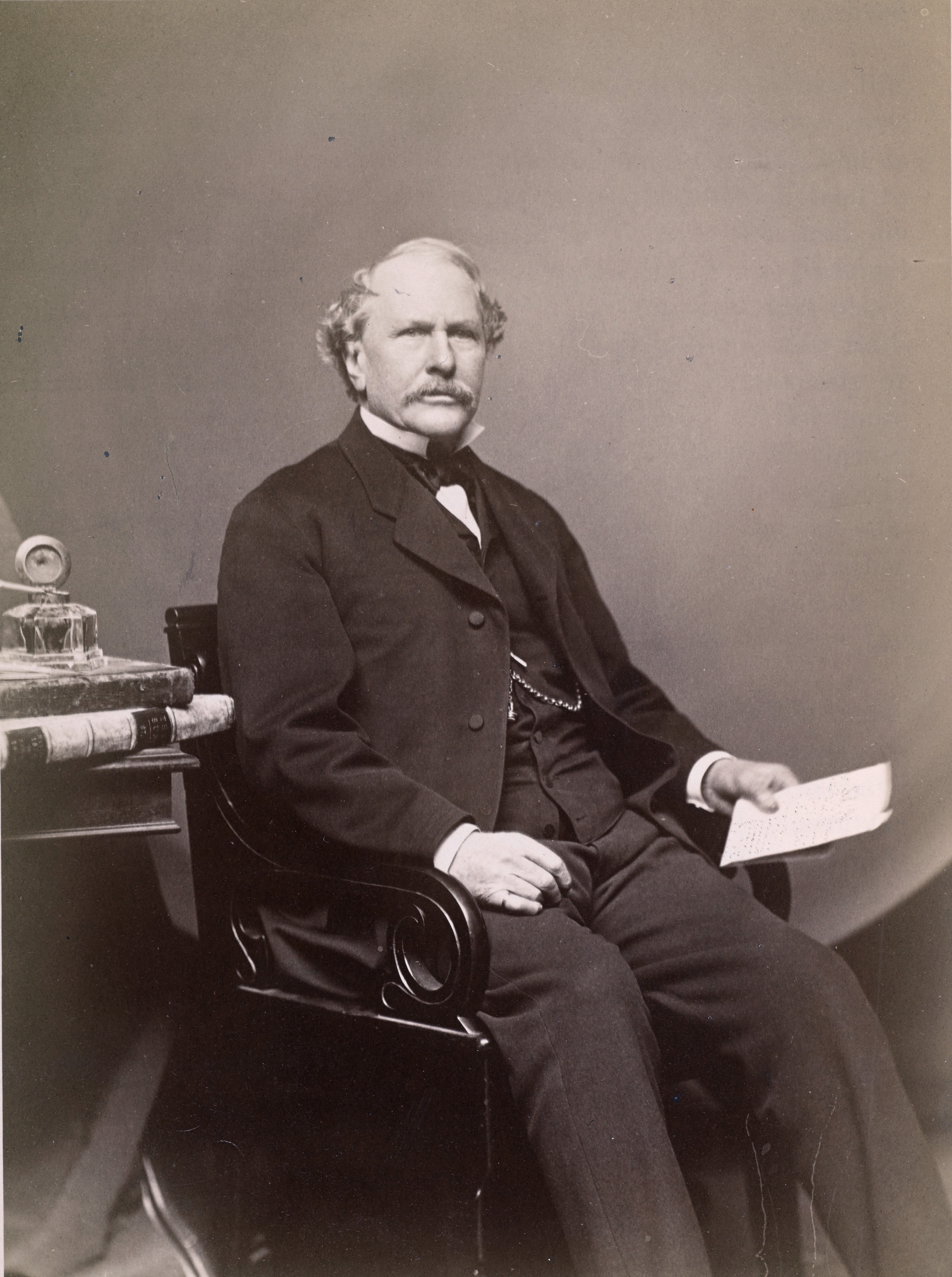
- 1871 photograph
- Born: August 10, 1806; East Providence, Rhode Island, U.S.
- Died: April 19, 1888 (aged 81); Baltimore, Maryland, U.S.
- Resting place: Green Mount Cemetery
- Occupation: Newspaper publisher
- Known for: Founder of The Sun of Baltimore and the Philadelphia Public Ledger
- Spouse: Mary Fox Campbell (m. 1838)
- Children: Mary Rose, Walter Robert, Helen Maria, Dorothy Margaret, Henry Thompson, Robert Arunah

Arunah Shepherdson Abell (August 10, 1806 – April 19, 1888) was an American publisher from New England who was active in Pennsylvania and Maryland. Born in East Providence, Rhode Island, Abell learned the newspaper business as an apprentice at the Providence Patriot. After stints with newspapers in Boston and New York City, he co-founded the Public Ledger in Philadelphia and later independently founded The Sun of Baltimore, Maryland; both were penny papers to appeal to the working class. Abell and his descendants continued ownership of The Sun as a family business until 1910.

Abell is noted as an innovative publisher in the newspaper business, making use of new systems and technology: pony express delivery of news from New Orleans, using the telegraph to transmit news from the first Mexican–American War and a President's speech to the Congress in Washington, D.C., and using the new rotary/cylinder printing press invented by Richard March Hoe.

== Biography ==
Abell was born in East Providence, Rhode Island, on August 10, 1806, to quartermaster Caleb Abell and Elona Shepherdson, who came from generations of English ancestry; his father's family were originally from Stapenhill, Derbyshire (now part of Staffordshire). After leaving school at the age of 14, he worked as a clerk in a retail business specializing in West Indian wares, before he became an apprentice at the Providence Patriot newspaper in 1822. He served as a journeyman printer in Boston and New York City.

In New York, he met two other young newspapermen, Azariah H. Simmons and William Moseley Swain, and they became friends. Together, they decided to go into business and found a "penny paper". At the time, the majority of newspapers were associated with a political party or with business interests. For example, Abell's newspaper in Baltimore was strongly associated with the Democratic Party; Abell was offered a political appointment as a result of his work on it. Penny papers were a relatively new phenomenon at the time. Originating in England, they made newspapers accessible to the working class, whereas other existing papers were too expensive for many consumers. As New York already had a number of penny papers, Abell, Simmons, and Swain founded their paper in Philadelphia where there was less competition, starting the Public Ledger in 1836. Within 2 years, the Public Ledger absorbed its nearest rival, the Philadelphia Transcript. Under Abell, the Ledger continued to appeal to the working class as a penny paper; he concentrated on sensationalist stories and scandals.

The following year, Abell convinced his partners to back him financially to found a penny paper in Baltimore, which at the time had a number of more expensive papers costing six pennies an issue. They agreed, based on his commitment to personally oversee the new venture. Abell published his first four-page tabloid-sized issue of The Sun on May 17, 1837. While it was an independent newspaper, The Sun editorially leaned toward the ideals of Jacksonian democracy as championed by sixth President Andrew Jackson. Soon each issue used the phrase "Light for All" as its motto, with a distinctive "vignette" (illustrated logo) on its masthead, which is still in use. The newspaper quickly became a success; within a year it had double the circulation (12,000) of its closest competitor.

In 1838, Abell married Mary Fox Campbell, a widow. They had children together.

By 1850, business was good enough that Abell commissioned architect James Bogardus to design a new building for the paper; it was to feature a cast iron facade. Throughout the 19th century, Baltimore had a number of newspapers. Many were overtly partisan, such as the pro-Republican, Baltimore American (it was derived from the city's first weekly/daily newspaper in 1773, reorganized in 1799). The Sun focused on society news rather than other more business-oriented news. Despite its origins as a penny paper, by the late 19th century the Sun had won a position as the newspaper of choice of Baltimore's upper class. By 1864, Abell was sole proprietor of The Sun and had sold his share in the Public Ledger to partner Swain.

Abell was a pioneer in making use of technology and a variety of transportation systems to transmit and deliver news. To get news from his reporters as quickly as possible, he used pony express, stagecoaches, trains, ships, and even carrier pigeons. He established a new pony express route from New Orleans, in conjunction with the publishers of the New Orleans Daily Picayune, during the Mexican–American War. With this system, he learned of the U.S. victory at Veracruz, Mexico before officials in the nation's capital, Washington, D.C.; he sent word to the president. He was the first newspaperman to use telegraphy when he transmitted President John Tyler's message of May 11, 1846, and he was the first to buy a Hoe cylinder press. The carrier pigeons were part of a network that Abell established with another newspaper publisher in New York; they carried messages between that city, Philadelphia, Baltimore, and Washington, D.C., and from incoming ships. They were superseded by the spread of telegraphy. Abell's newsroom received foreign news by a convoluted route. News from Europe was delivered to Halifax, Nova Scotia by ship; from there it was transported overland by pony express to Annapolis Royal, N.S., by steamship to Portland, Maine, and then by rail to Baltimore. Through a journey of nearly one thousand miles, the news was delivered in little more than two days from Halifax to Baltimore. In later years, Abell supported telegraph pioneer Samuel F.B. Morse and helped finance the construction of telegraph lines into Baltimore.

By the start of the American Civil War, Abell had increased circulation of The Sun to 30,000 subscribers. He remained owner of The Sun until his death in Baltimore on April 19, 1888. Abell is entombed in Baltimore's Green Mount Cemetery off Greenmount Avenue (Maryland Route 45) and East North Avenue.

His three sons and their grandsons retained control of the newspaper until 1910. As a result of a financial restructuring of the former Abell–Swain–Simmons partnership into a reorganized A.S. Abell Company, the newspaper was sold from family control. Also sold was the participating Safe Deposit bank and trust company which they had owned for those three decades.

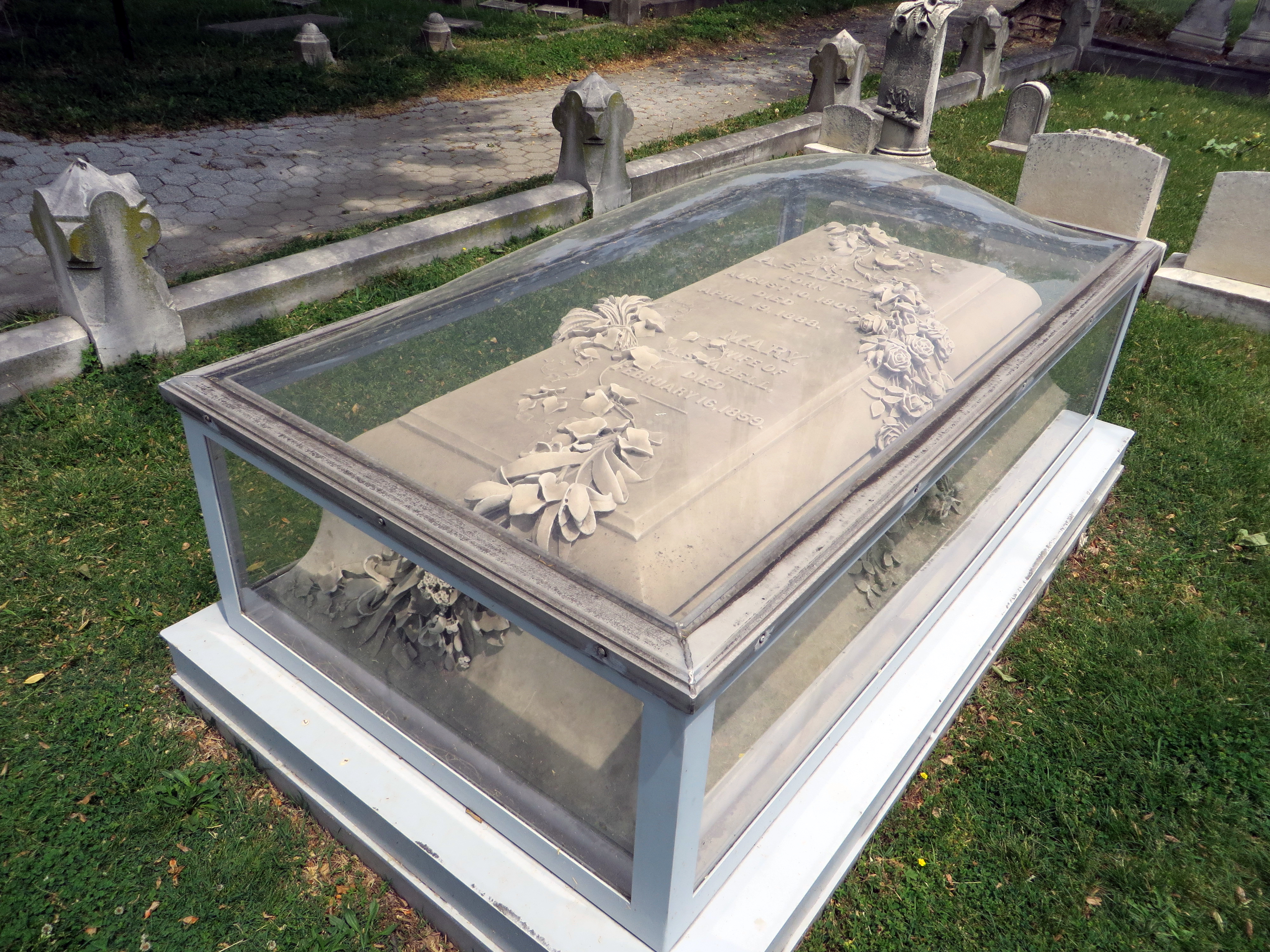
Abell's gravestone

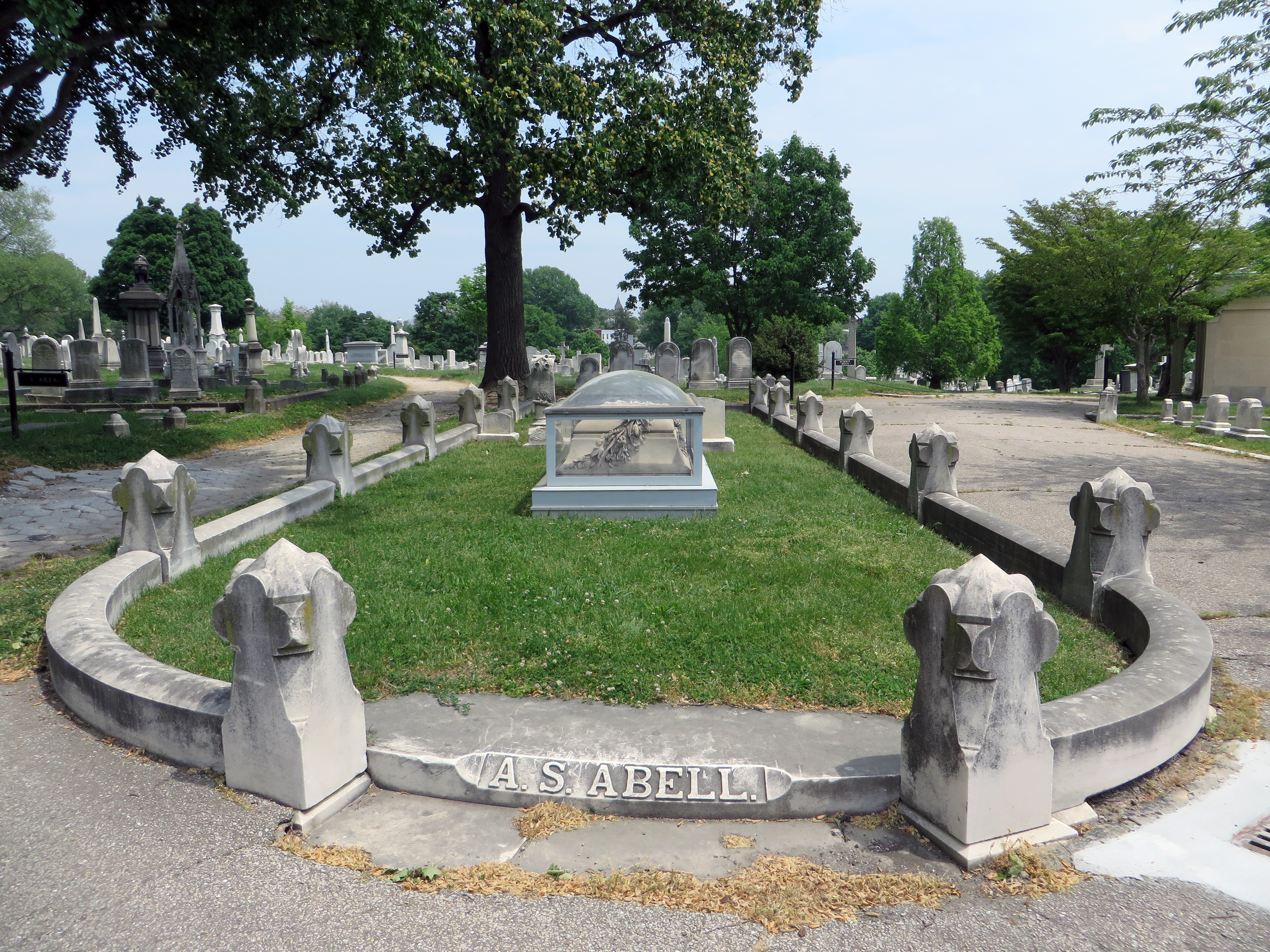
Abell's gravesite in Green Mount Cemetery

== Legacy and honors ==
The Baltimore Sun has continued as a prominent, award-winning city, regional and national newspaper in the United States. As its founder, Abell has been criticized posthumously by opponents of positions held by the newspaper's editorial board. For instance, state senator Henry Herbert Balch denounced Abell during a filibuster of legislation to authorize construction of the Chesapeake Bay Bridge in 1949.

- The Abell Building, designed by Baltimore City Hall architect George A. Frederick, was named in his honor; as of 2009 it houses apartments.
- During World War II, one of the famed "Liberty" cargo ships was named the S.S. Arunah S. Abell in his honor; it was built in South Baltimore's Bethlehem-Fairfield Shipyard near the Brooklyn-Curtis Bay neighborhoods.
- The Abell Foundation was established in the 1950s by Harry C. Black and his older brother Van Lear Black, (1875–1930) in the publisher's honor; it has assisted programs throughout the Baltimore and Maryland areas.
