= Hoes (surname) =

Hoes is a Dutch surname. Notable people with the name include:

- Abbey Hoes (born 1994), Dutch actress
- Hannah Hoes Van Buren (1783–1819), wife of U.S. President Martin Van Buren
- Isa Hoes (born 1967), Dutch actress
- L. J. Hoes (born 1990), American baseball player
- Onno Hoes (born 1961), Dutch mayor, brother of Isa

== See also ==
- Hoe (disambiguation)
- Rudolf Höss (1900–1947), sometimes spelled Hoess, German Nazi commandant of Auschwitz concentration camp
