= Richard March Hoe =

American inventor (1812–1886)

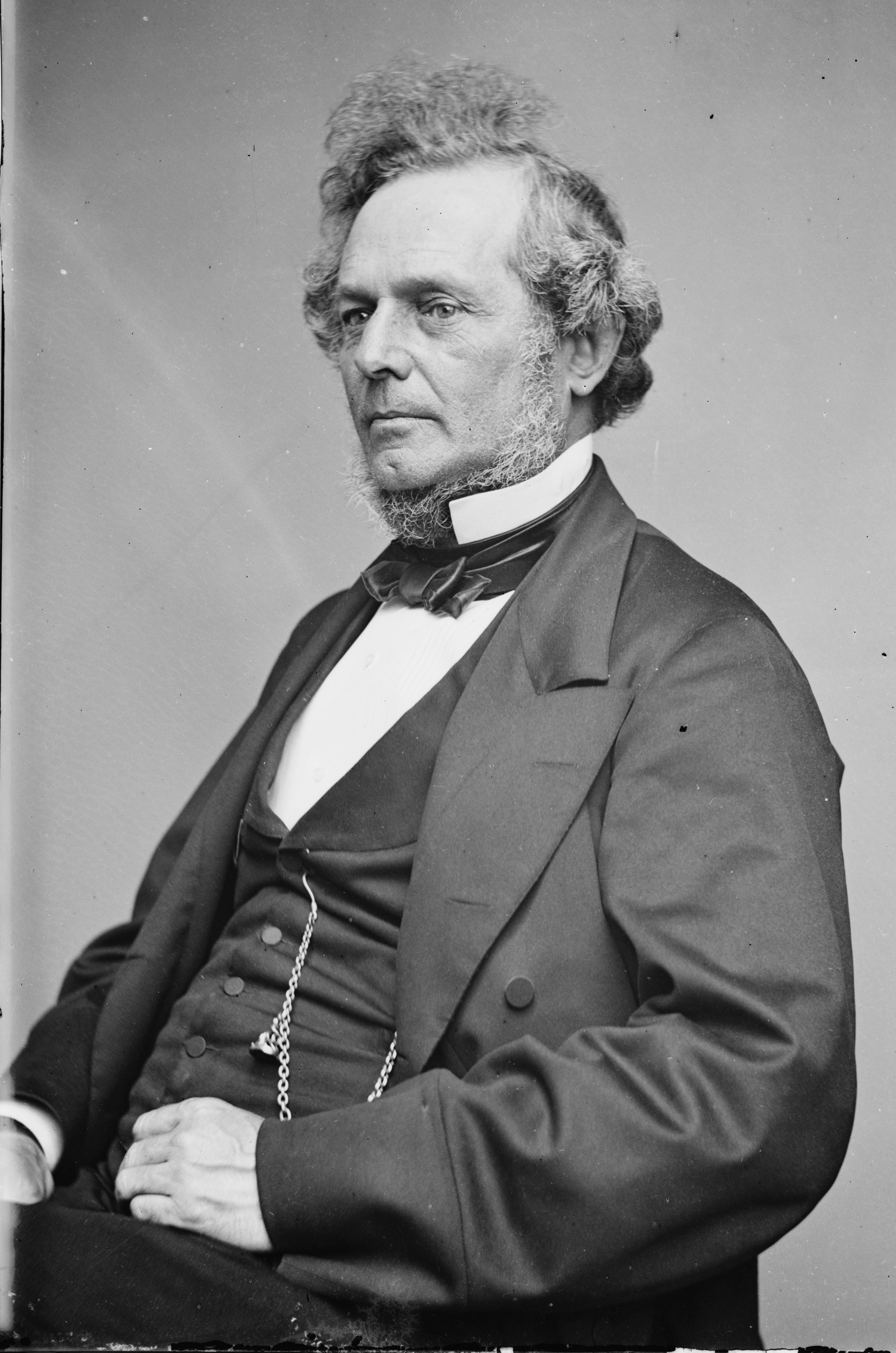
- Born: September 12, 1812; New York City, U.S.
- Died: June 7, 1886 (aged 73); Florence, Italy
- Engineering career
- Significant design: Rotary printing press
- Significant advance: Printing press

Richard March Hoe (middle name spelled in some 1920s records as "Marsh"; September 12, 1812 – June 7, 1886) was an American inventor from New York City who designed a rotary printing press identical to Josiah Warren's original invention, and related advancements, including the "Hoe web perfecting press" in 1871; it used a continuous roll of paper and revolutionized newspaper publishing.

== Biography ==
Richard March Hoe was born in New York City, the son of Robert Hoe (1784–1833), an English-born American mechanic from Leicestershire. His brothers were Peter Smith Hoe and Robert Hoe II.

His father, with brothers-in-law Peter and Matthew Smith, established a steam-powered manufactory of printing presses in New York City. At the age of fifteen, Richard joined their enterprise. Several years later in 1833, he became a senior member of his father's firm R. Hoe & Company. After his father's death that year, Hoe became head of the company. He was joined later by his younger brothers Robert Hoe II (1815–1884) and Peter Smith Hoe (1821–1902).

Richard Hoe married Lucy Gilbert Hoe (1813 – November 9, 1841) and had two daughters, Emily Amelia Hoe and Adeline Hoe. Both of these daughters married brothers Cyrus and DeWitt Lawrence. After Lucy died at the young age of 28, Richard married Anne Corbin Platt Hoe, with whom he had two additional daughters, Anne Corbin Hoe Platt (1852–1887) and Mary Gilbert Hoe Harper (1854–1925). His daughter, Anne, died at the young age of 34 during childbirth, and both twins died as well. Although he lived much of his life in New York City, he spent years renovating "Brightside" and gradually moved the family there about 1857. The manor house was situated on 53 acres in the Bronx. Hoe died on June 7, 1886, in Florence, Italy.

== Inventions ==
Early on, Hoe added the production of steel saws to his business and introduced improvements to their manufacture. In 1837, he visited England and obtained a patent for a better process of grinding saws. In connection with his factory, Hoe established an apprentice's school where free instruction was given.

He is most well known for his invention in 1843 of a rotary printing press, based on an identical invention unveiled in New York in 1832 by Josiah Warren. Warren chose not to patent his press design, so Hoe was free to imitate it. Type was placed on a revolving cylinder, a design that could print much faster than the old flatbed printing press. It received U.S. patent 5,199 in 1847, and was placed in commercial use the same year. Arunah Shepherdson Abell, publisher of The Sun in Baltimore, was among the first to buy it and put it into use. In its early days, it was variously called the "Hoe lightning press," and "Hoe's Cylindrical-Bed Press."

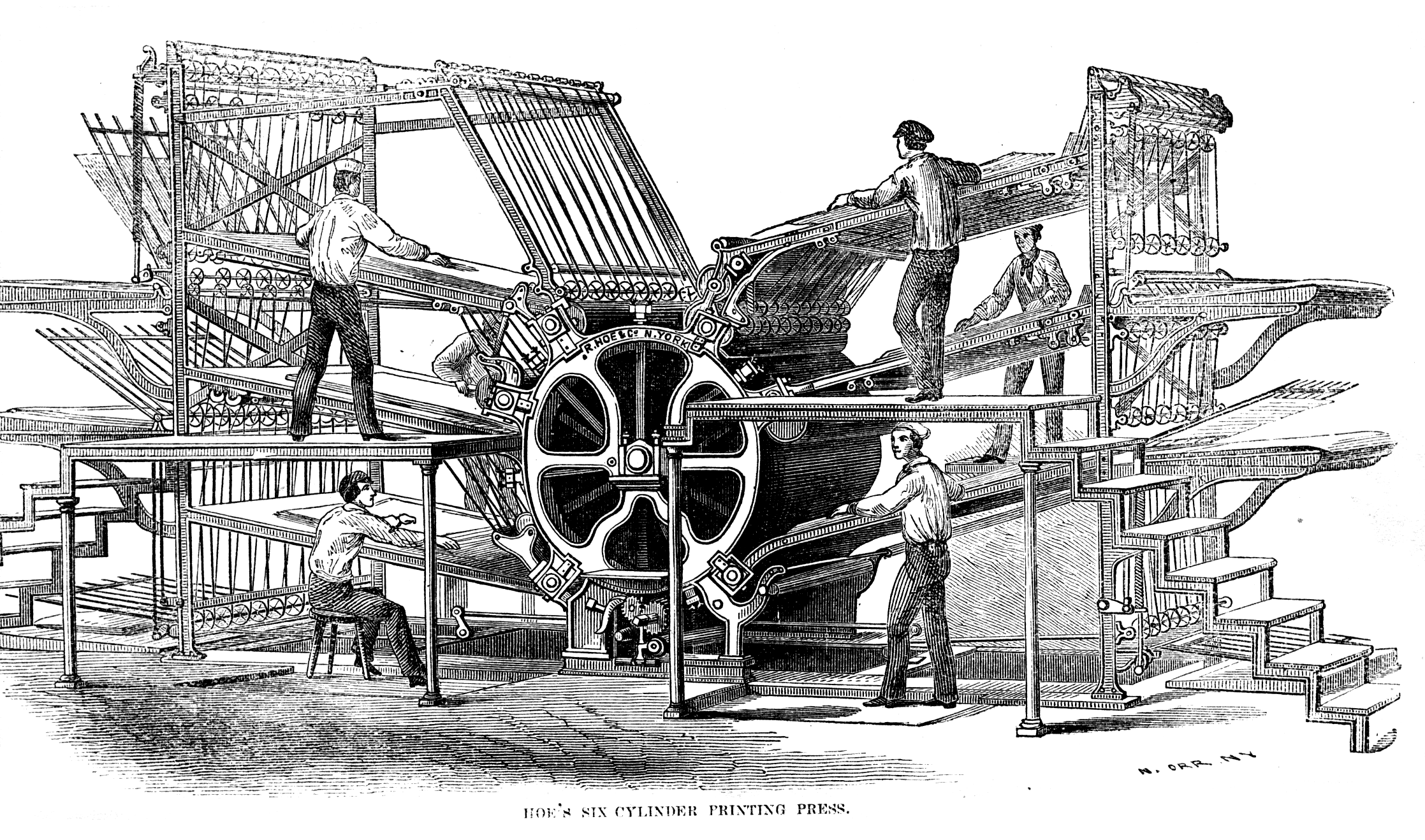
Hoe's 6-cylinder press, from N. Orr's History of the Processes of Manufacture (1864)

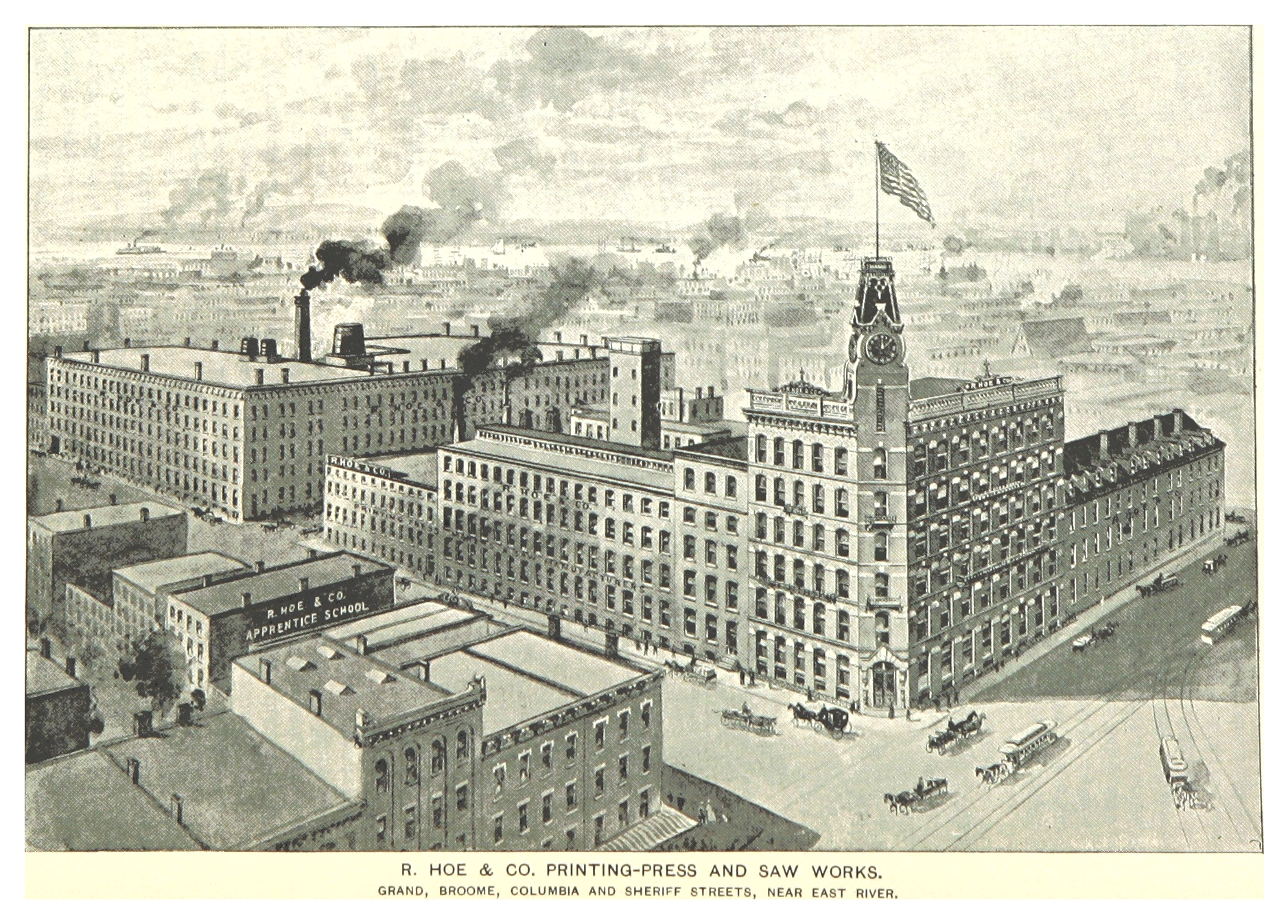
R. Hoe & Co printing press and saw works, Columbia Street, near East River

In 1870 Hoe developed a rotary press that printed both sides of a page in a single operation, what he called the "Hoe web perfecting press." Hoe's press used a continuous roll of paper five miles long, which was put through the machine at the rate of 800 feet (240 m) a minute. As the roll emerged, it passed over a knife which cut pages apart; they were next run through an apparatus which folded the pages for the mail or for carriers. These completely printed and folded newspapers were delivered as quickly as the eye could follow them. It produced 18,000 papers an hour and was used the first time by the New York Tribune.

Hoe was a Freemason. He died while traveling in 1886 in Florence, Italy. His nephew, Robert Hoe (1839–1909), wrote a notable Short History of the Printing Press (1902). He also made further improvements in printing.

Although Hoe was known for his rotary printing press, he also had much practice before, since he took on his fathers work after he retired, he perfected many cylinder presses, and he continued to improve, eventually creating his prize invention, the hoe lightning press.

== Brightside estate ==
Hoe lived with his wife, Mary, and children on a 53-acre (210,000 m^{2}) estate, called Brightside, in the Morrisania/Hunts Point section of the Bronx. Richard's brother, Peter Smith Hoe, also had a house (Sunnyslope) on the same estate. This building still stands at the corner of Faile Street and Lafayette Avenue and houses the Bright Temple African Methodist Episcopal Church. His family sold the estate in 1904 to developers speculating on an expansion of the New York City Subway into the Bronx.

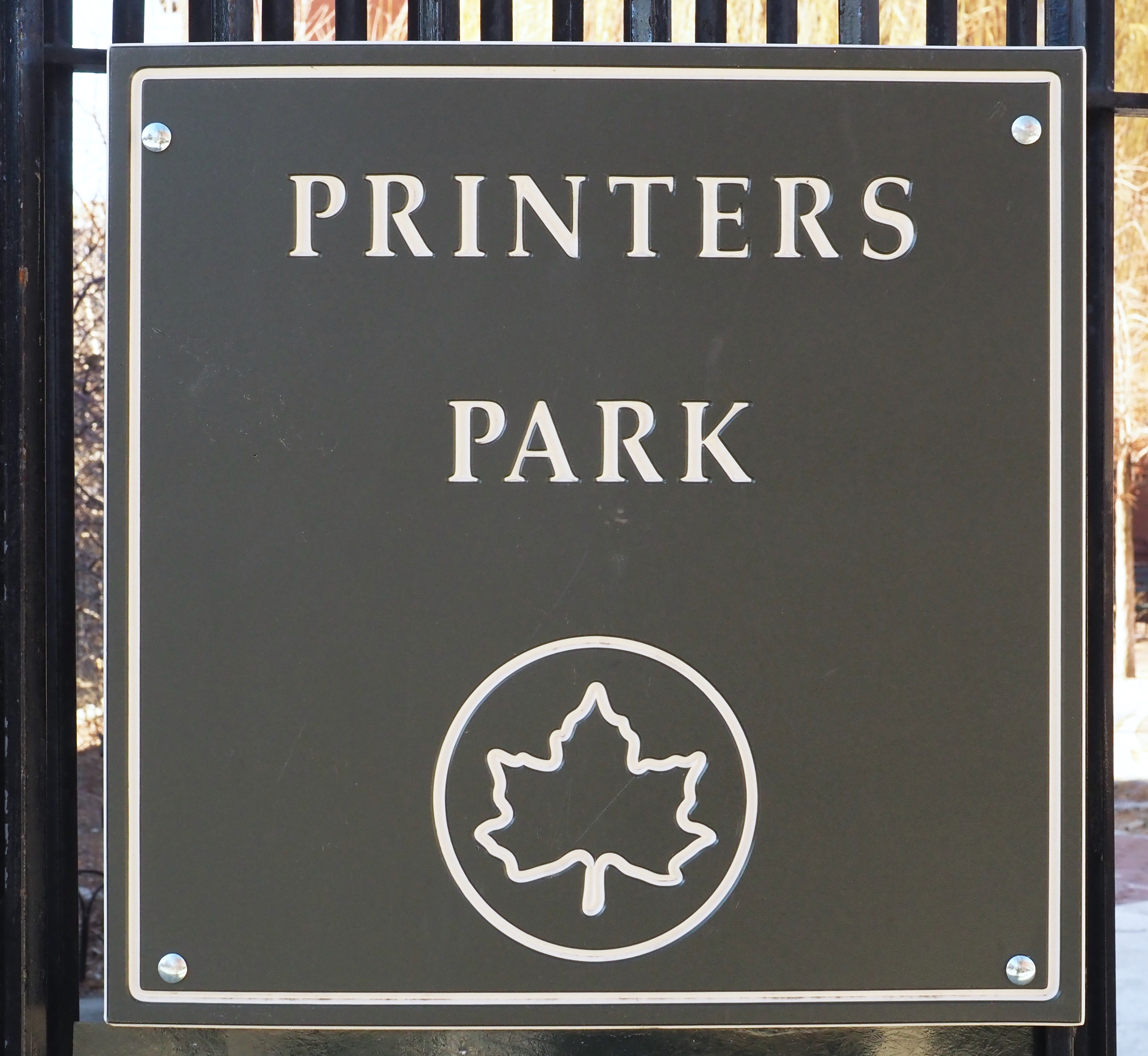
Printer's Park sign (missing the apostrophe)

Several streets in the area are named after historical figures in the printing industry. Aldus Street was named after Aldo Manuzio. Guttenberg Street (with two "t"s) was named after Johannes Gutenberg; it was renamed East 165th Street in 1911. Hoe Avenue runs north from what is now Bruckner Boulevard. Printer's Park is located at the former site of his mansion, at the corner on Aldus Street and Hoe Avenue in the Bronx. The newly reconstructed park re-opened in April 2010, equipped with a play structure inspired by the rotary printing press.
