= Sunnyslope (Bronx) =

Historic house in the Bronx, New York

- U.S. National Register of Historic Places
- New York City Landmark
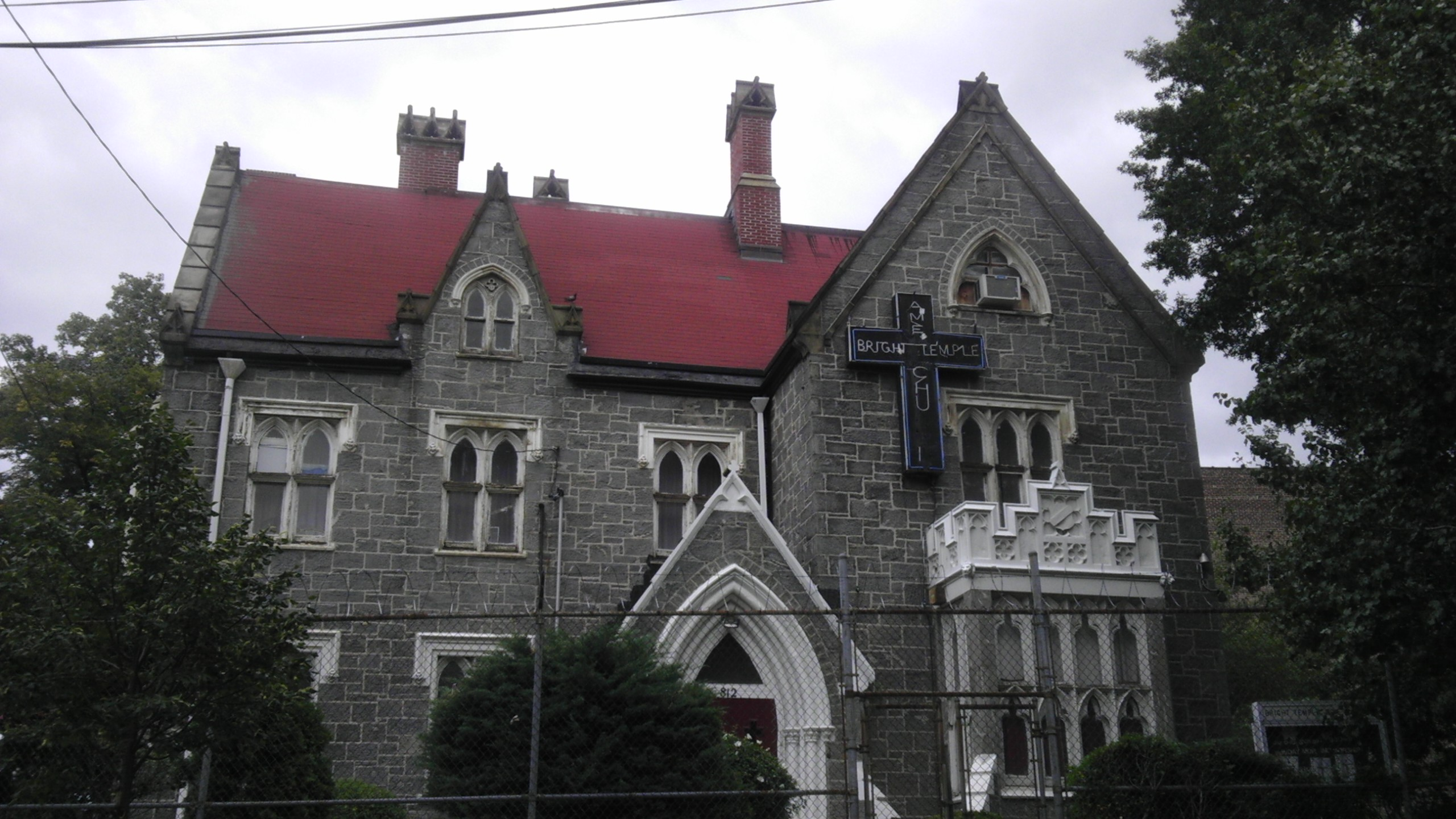

- Location within New York City Location within New York Location within the United States
- Location: 812 Faile St., Bronx, New York
- Coordinates: 40°49′2″N 73°53′13″W
- Area: less than one acre
- Built: 1859
- Architectural style: Late Gothic Revival
- NRHP reference No.: 83001644
- NYCL No.: 1079

Significant dates
- Added to NRHP: September 15, 1983
- Designated NYCL: July 28, 1981

Sunnyslope is a historic home located in Hunts Point in the South Bronx in New York City. It was built about 1860 by Peter Hoe, brother of Richard March Hoe, on their family estate. It is a 2 1/2-story Gothic Revival–style house built in the Picturesque mode. In 1919 it was sold to Temple Beth Elohim and later became home to an African Methodist Episcopal congregation.

It was listed as a New York City Landmark in 1981, and on the National Register of Historic Places in 1983. It later became home to Bright Temple A.M.E. Church.
