= Robert Hoe III =

American businessman

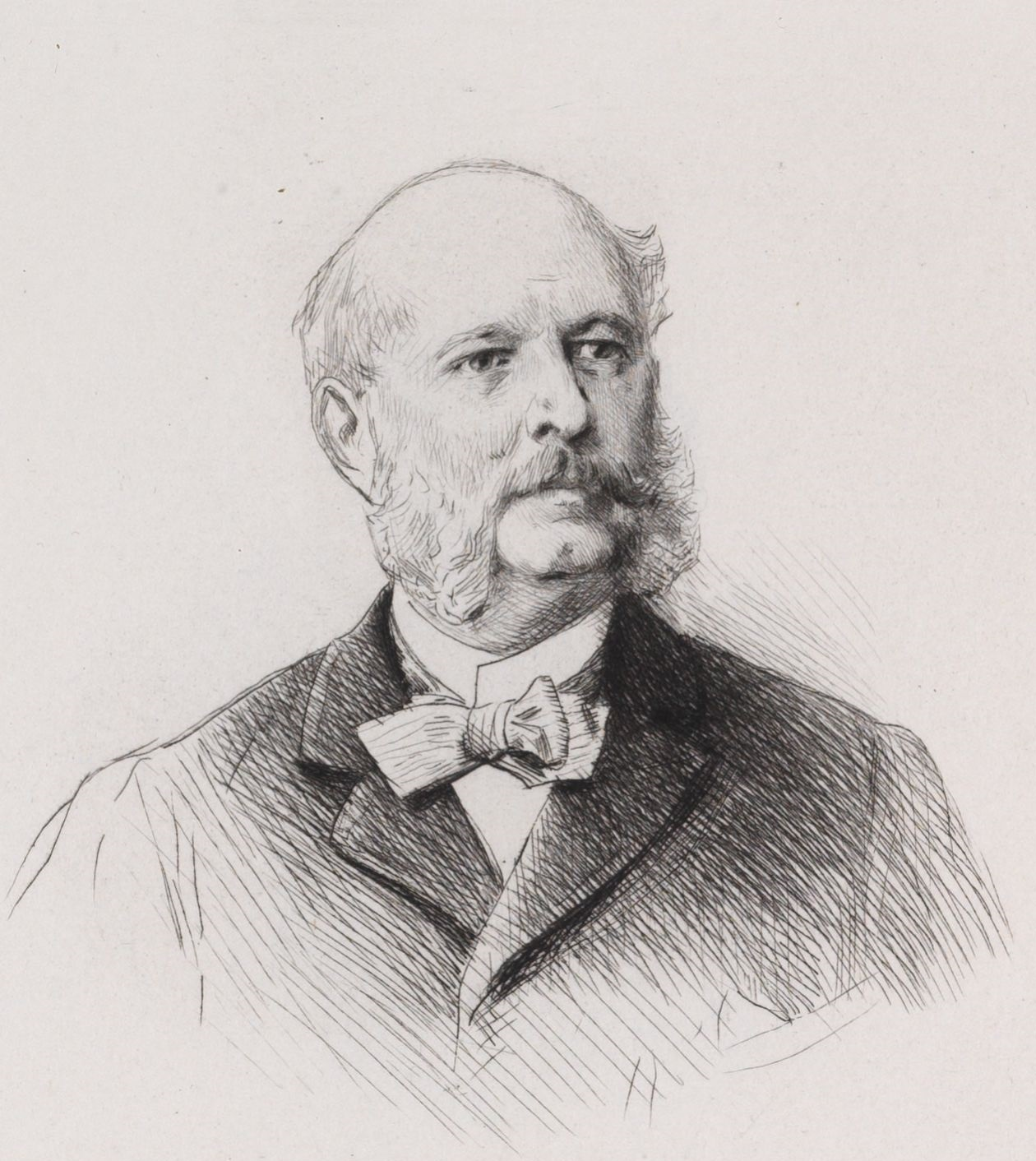
Robert Hoe

Hoe press

Robert Hoe III (10 March 1839, in New York City – 22 September 1909, in London) was an American businessman and producer of printing press equipment. He succeeded Richard March Hoe as head of R. Hoe & Company, which continued its preeminence among printing-press makers. He was one of the organizers and first president of the Grolier Club, the well-known New York organization for the promotion of bookmaking as an art. He was also one of the founders of the Metropolitan Museum of Art in New York City.

== Life ==
Hoe was an extensive collector of rare books and manuscripts as well as silver, miniatures, and other art objects, his collections at the time of his death being valued at several million dollars. The catalogues of his library were unique and valuable from both a typographical and bibliographical standpoint. His collection was sold at auction during 1911 and 1912 with almost half going to Henry E. Huntington including a Gutenberg Bible.

Following Hoe's death at his house in Brunswick Square, London, a Mrs Brown from Lexington, Kentucky, daughter of his manager, sued Hoe's estate for $250,000, claiming that he had promised her a large sum of money before he died. She had been living in London, at the same address as Hoe, and two maids confirmed in court that they had a close relationship. A former husband of Mrs Brown also claimed that Hoe had paid him $20,000 as a settlement for a threatened "alienation-of-affection" suit. The matter was eventually settled out of court.

=== Family ===
On August 12, 1863, at Trinity Chapel, Wavertree near Liverpool, he married Olivia Phelps James (1837–1935), who was the daughter of Daniel and Elizabeth Woodbridge (Phelps) James. Olivia's brother was Daniel Willis James. Robert and Olivia had 9 children.

== Works ==
He edited Maberly's Print Collector (1880).

- Bookbinding as a Fine Art (Grolier Club; New York, 1886)
- A Short History of the Printing Press (New York, 1902)
