= R. Hoe & Company =

- Type: Defunct
- Industry: Graphic Arts Equipment
- Founded: New York City, United States, 1805
- Founders: Robert Hoe, Matthew Smith
- Defunct: 1984
- Headquarters: New York City, United States

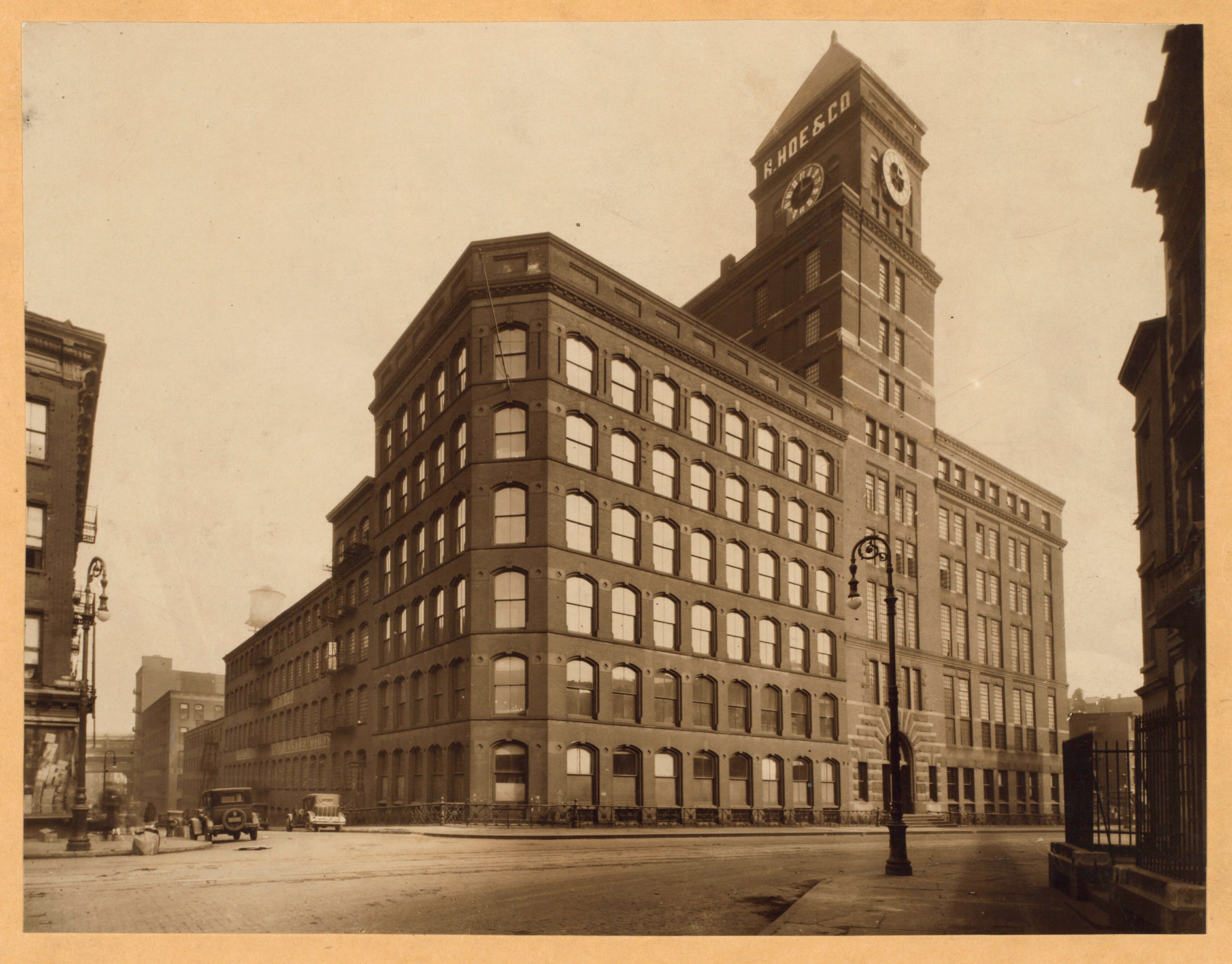
R. Hoe & Company Headquarters in Manhattan at Grand Street and Sheriff Street,1930

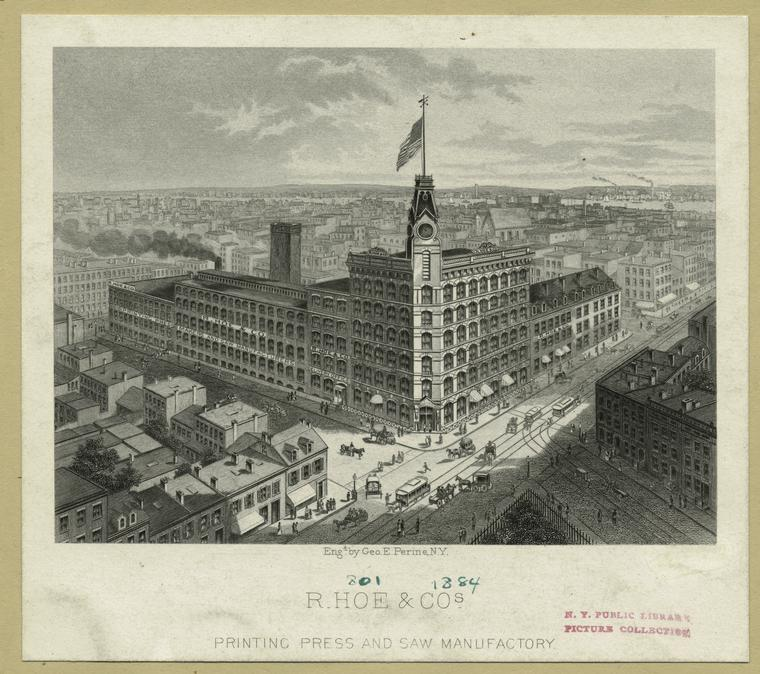
Company headquarters in 1884, 504 to 520 Grand Street in New York City

R. Hoe & Company was a New York City-based printing press manufacturer established by Peter Smith, Matthew Smith (died 1822), and their brother-in-law, English emigrant Robert Hoe (1784–1833), in 1805 as Smith, Hoe & Company.

== Early years ==
The company initially specialized in the manufacture of wooden hand printing presses, but later added saw-making. In 1819 the company expanded to printing presses. Peter Smith's iron Acorn press was announced to the trade in 1822. A replica of the Acorn press used to print the First Edition of the Book of Mormon in 1829 is on display at Brigham Young University–Idaho. After Smith's death, Hoe and his sons renamed the company and worked on improving existing machinery. In 1827 Hoe bought and improved a patent on wrought iron framed presses initially owned by Samuel Rust.

After their father's death, sons Richard and Robert Hoe (March 10, 1839–September 23, 1909) took control of the company and continued to innovate the printing process. The company developed a mechanical sheet delivery system, invented and patented the rotary printing press, and developed the first type revolving presses. R. Hoe & Company helped facilitate the rapid and inexpensive production of newspapers.

Their 1855 lithographic presses, in dimensions of 19x24 inches to 38x48 inches, sold for $165–375. A six-cylinder model was able to produce 166,000 16-page newspapers per hour.

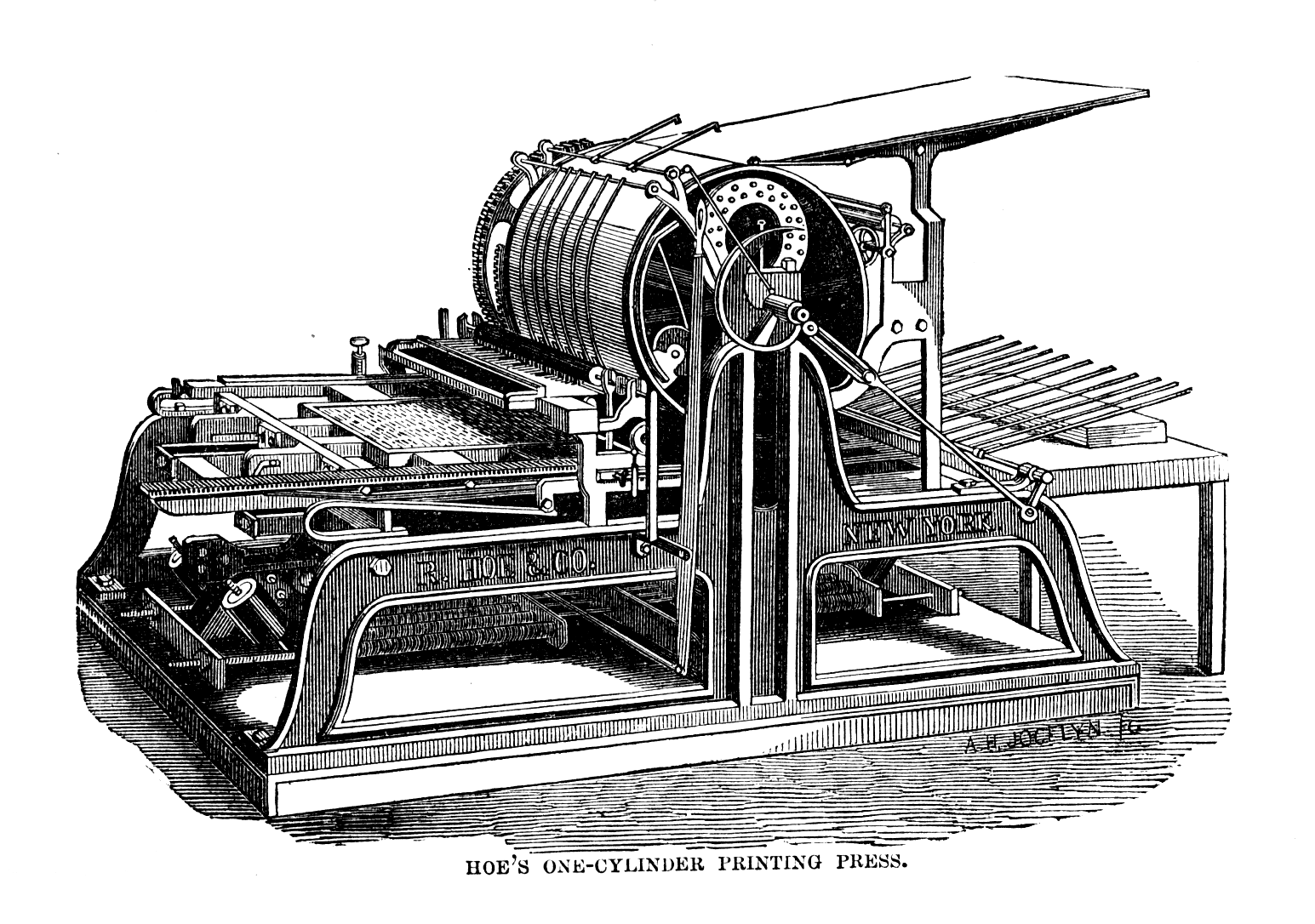
Hoe's one-cylinder press. These cost $1,390–2,600 when new in 1855 and were available in dimensions of 41x28 inches to 60x40 inches.

A hand-operated, iron Washington Press, serial number 2356, manufactured by R. Hoe & Company was in commercial use for more than a century in Newfoundland. William Squarey, editor of the Harbor Grace Standard and Conception Bay Advertiser newspaper, purchased the press second-hand to print the first issue, circulated on 16 Nov 1859. Munn & Oke, Ltd., the publisher of the Harbor Grace Standard when it ceased printing in the mid-1930s, continued to use the press to print posters and other commercial business until the press was purchased by Memorial University in 1962. This ornate press, still bearing two decorative silhouettes on its face, is housed at the Memorial University Library (St. John's, NL) and was named by the university, “Pitcher Plant Press”.

== Employee problems ==
In 1855 the company employed 400 people. By May 4, 1886, the 700 Hoe employees went on strike to demand that their ten-hour workday be reduced to nine, without a reduction in pay. After negotiations, the company agreed to reduce the workday, but also to reduce pay accordingly. The company's machinists went on strike in July 1898, congregating in the surrounding streets. Police were called on day seven to disperse the crowd. In 1902, during the funeral procession of Rabbi Jacob Joseph, some employees of the Hoe factory started a riot and assaulted some of the 50,000 mourners as they passed. 200 police responded and joined the riot on the side of the factory workers.

By 1909 the company employed 2,500 at its New York factory and 800 in London.

== Company growth ==
During World War II, the company began to manufacture parts for weapons.

The company added a subsidiary, Hoe Export-Import Company, in late 1950. The business introduced the Printmaster in 1954. The new printing press was suited to newspapers of medium and small size, with a circulation between 7,500 and 100,000. The presses were first built in the fall of 1954 for a spring 1955 delivery. It was capable of turning out 40,000 newspapers per hour and could easily convert to four color or spot color printing throughout the newspaper. Without stopping the press, the equipment responsible for folding the newspapers could switch from a mail fold to a regular newspaper fold. Additional features were ink economy, cleanliness, and ease of maintenance.

== Decline and bankruptcy ==
After the war, the price of Hoe stock dropped and by 1969 the company was forced to seek bankruptcy protection. Throughout the 1970s, production of printing presses was discontinued and the factory was dismantled while the board focused on revitalizing the saw-making aspect of the company. In 1984, Pacific Saw and Knife Company purchased R. Hoe & Company and formed Pacific/Hoe Saw and Knife Company. It is still in operation today.
