= Rotary printing press =

Printing method

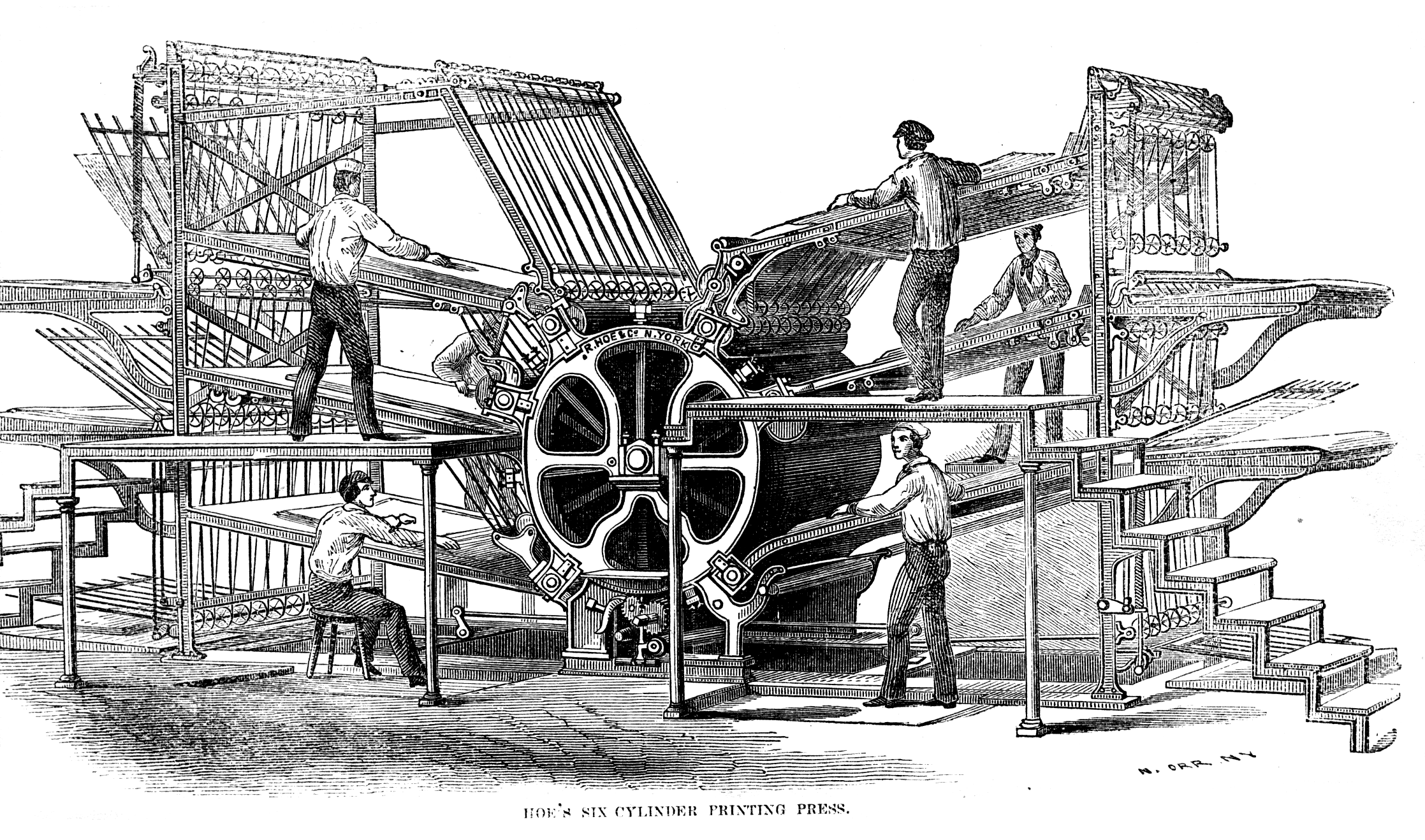
Hoe's six-cylinder rotary press from the 1860s. The printing plates are located on the large cylinder in the middle.

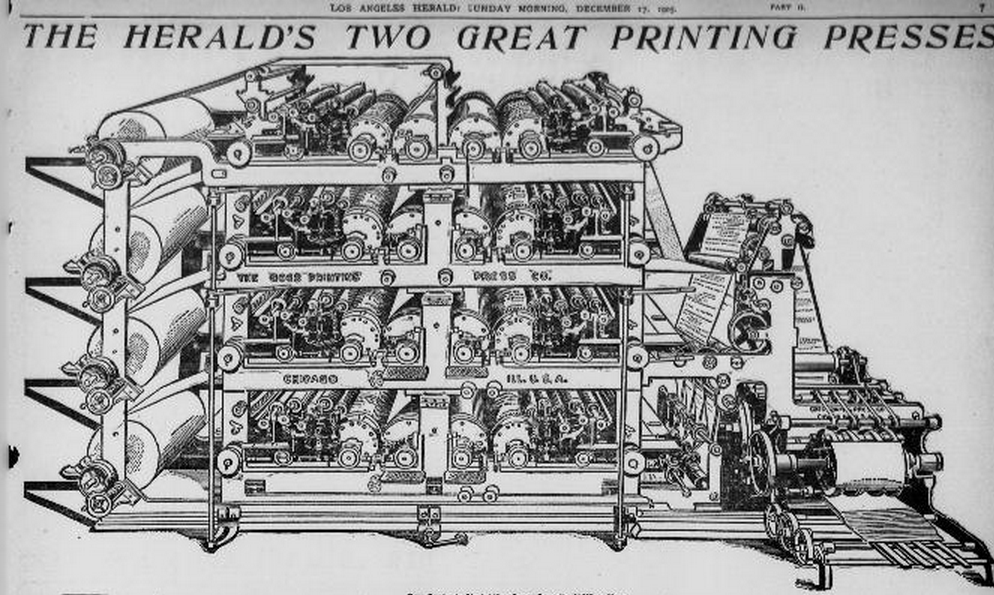
Goss quadruple straightline printing press, 1905

A rotary printing press is a printing press in which the images to be printed are curved around a cylinder. Printing can be done on various substrates, including paper, cardboard, and plastic. Substrates can be sheet feed or unwound on a continuous roll through the press to be printed and further modified if required (e.g. die cut, overprint varnished, embossed). Printing presses that use continuous rolls are sometimes referred to as "web presses".

== Developmental history ==
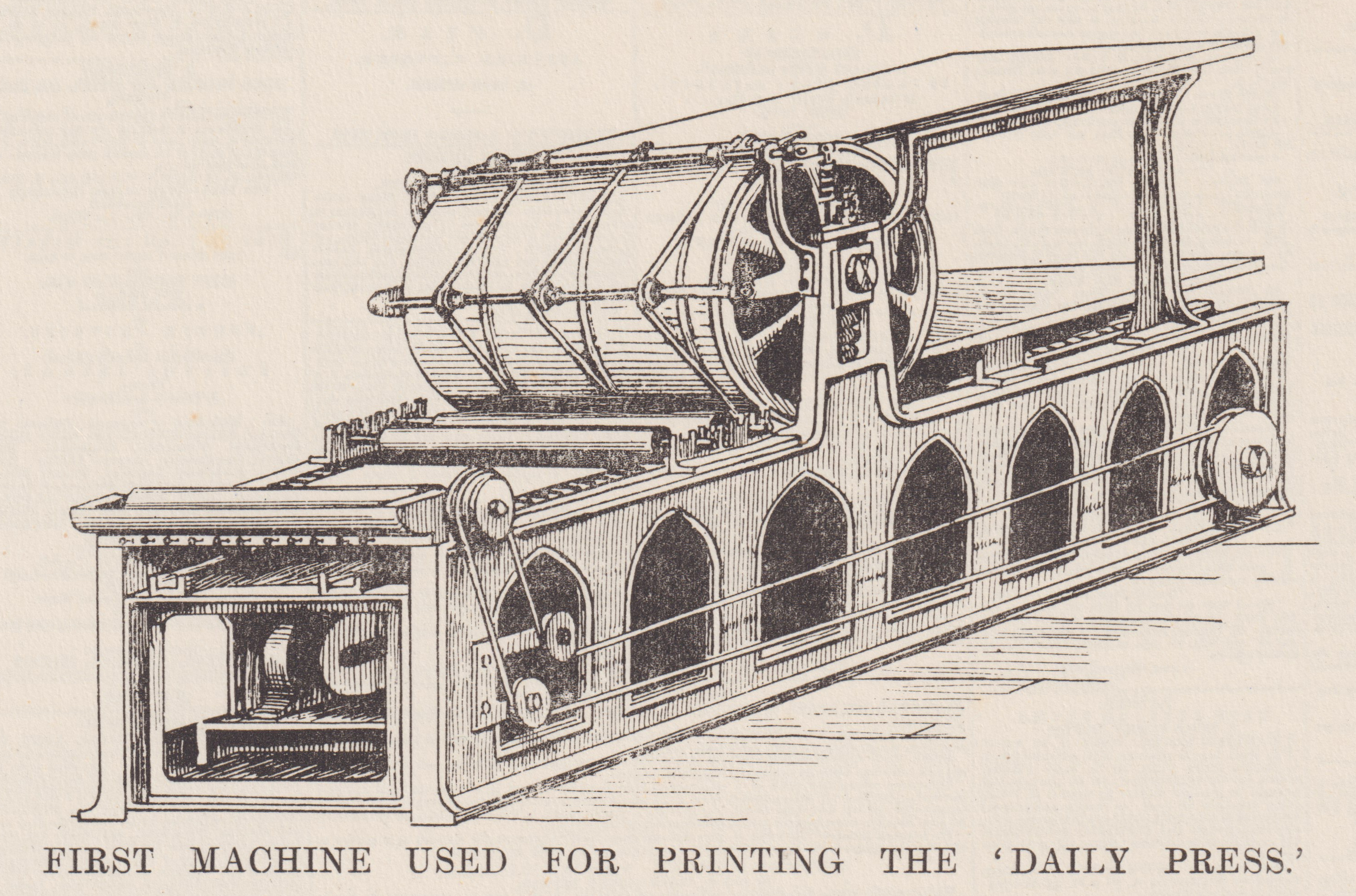
Early rotary newspaper printing press in Bristol, 1858

William Nicholson filed a 1790 patent for a rotary press. The rotary press itself is an evolution of the cylinder press, also patented by William Nicholson, invented by Beaucher of France in the 1780s and by Friedrich Koenig in the early 19th century. Rotary drum printing was invented by Josiah Warren in 1832, whose design was imitated by Richard March Hoe in 1843. An 1844 patent replaced the reciprocating platforms used in earlier designs with a fixed platform served by rotating drums, and through a series of advances a complete rotary printing press was perfected in 1846, and patented in 1847. It appeared in Edinburgh in 1851 and then traveled to London, where it was used by The Times newspaper in 1853. It then traveled to France in 1866 and Germany in 1873. By the time it reached Spain in 1885, it was in common use. Some sources describe the Parisian Hippolyte Auguste Marinoni as the inventor of the rotary printing press, but this was the subject of a patent dispute that was decided in Hoe's favor. A.S. Abell of the Baltimore Sun was the first American user of the rotary press.

== Types of rotary printing presses ==
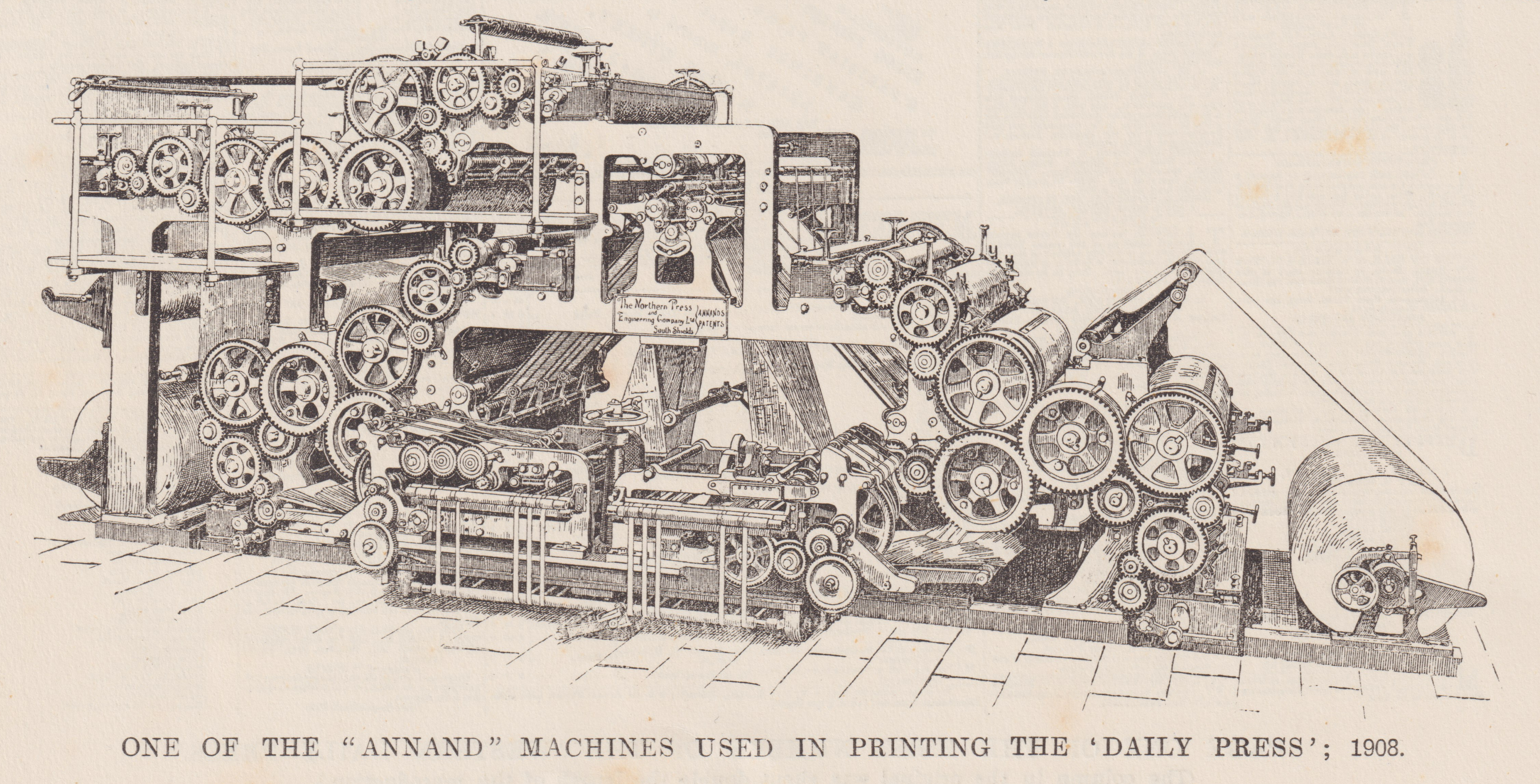
'Annand' newspaper press, 1908

Today, there are four main types of rotary presses; letterpress, offset (including web offset), rotogravure, and flexo (short for flexography). Although all the types use cylinders to print, they vary in their method.

- Rotary letterpress printing uses type metal plates molded in the form of a cylinder. The plates, called stereotypes, are coated with ink, then pressed against a continuous roll of paper. Rotary letterpress printing was used in the mid-twentieth century to print most major newspapers.
- In offset lithography, the image is chemically applied to a plate, generally through exposure of photosensitive layers on the plate material. Lithography is based on the fact that water and oil do not mix, which enables the planographic process to work. In the context of a printing plate, a wettable surface (the non-image area) may also be termed hydrophilic and a non-wettable surface (the image area) hydrophobic.
- Gravure is a process where small cells or holes are etched into a copper cylinder, which are able to be filled with ink. All the colours are etched in different angles, thus while printing every colour is placed in proper position to give the appropriate image.
- Flexography is a relief system in which a raised image is created on a typical polymer-based plate.

In stamp collecting, rotary-press-printed stamps are sometimes a different size than stamps printed with a flat plate. This happens because the stamp images are further apart on a rotary press, which makes the individual stamps larger (typically 0.5 to 1 mm (0.020 to 0.039 in)).

== See also ==
- Wetting
