= Gala-Salvador Dalí Foundation =

Cultural institution founded by Salvador Dalí

Coordinates: 42.2680°N 2.9591°E

- Founded: 23 December 1983
- Founder: Salvador Dalí
- Type: State owned, privately organized
- Purpose: Legacy of Salvador Dalí
- Location: Figueres, Catalonia, Spain
- Owner: Spanish State
- Key people: Jordi Mercader i Miró (President of the Board)
- Website: salvador-dali.org

The Gala-Salvador Dalí Foundation (Catalan: Fundació Gala-Salvador Dalí; Spanish: Fundación Gala-Salvador Dalí) is a private cultural institution founded by the painter Salvador Dalí with the mission of promoting his artistic, cultural and intellectual œuvre. It is also named after his wife, Gala Dalí. Although the Foundation manages the assets, trademark rights, intellectual property and image of the painter, it is not its owner, since Dalí bequeathed all of his assets to the Spanish State in his last will.

== History ==
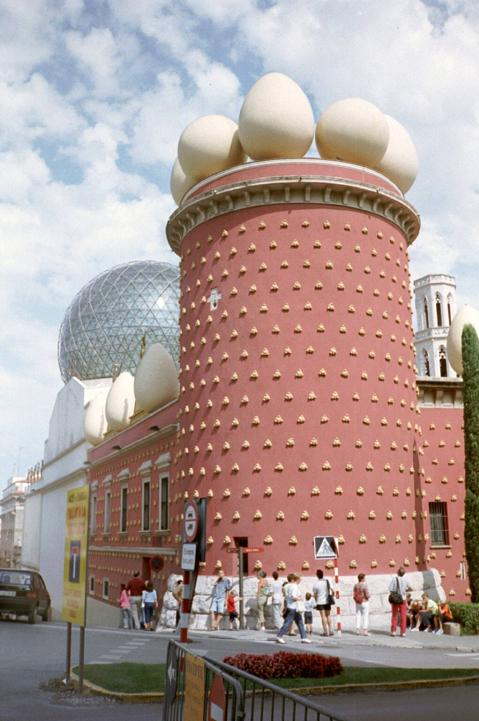
The Gala-Salvador Dalí Foundation headquarters are located at the Galatea Tower, in the Dalí Theatre and Museum

The Foundation was created on 23 December 1983 at the Castle of Púbol, the following year after the death of Gala. Dalí presided over and directed the foundation personally since its outset. His death on 23 January 1989 inaugurated a period of transition until 1991, when the board of the foundation appointed Ramon Boixadós Malé as president.

The Foundation manages its three museums and Dali's personal archive, while also organizes exhibitions, manages new acquisitions of works and supervises publications. It also manages the artist's copyright and carries out appraisals of works.

In May 2011, the Foundation made the most expensive acquisition in its history, when it bought Dalí's painting Enigmatic Elements in a Landscape (1934), for €7.8 million.

== Mission ==
According to the statutes, the organization's mission is to "promote, disseminate, honor, protect and defend, in the territory of the Spanish State and that of any other state, the artistic, cultural and intellectual work of the painter, his goods and rights of any kind; his life experience, his artistic, intellectual and cultural projects and works; his memory and the universal recognition of his great contribution to the Fine Arts, to Culture and contemporary thought".

== Museums and collections ==
The Gala-Salvador Dalí Foundation manages several museums and collections. The group of museums had a total of 1,431,748 visitors in 2011, which generated €9,768,300 in ticket sales.

=== Dalí Theatre and Museum ===
The Dalí Theatre and Museum, was inaugurated in 1974, after works of adaptation held on the remains of the former theater in Figueres, supervised by Dalí himself. They are all managed by the Gala-Salvador Dalí Foundation. The museum is considered the largest surrealist monument in the world. It forms part of the Dalí triangle in Empordà, together with the Castle of Púbol and the Salvador Dalí House Museum, in Portlligat.

=== Dalí·Jewels ===
Dalí·Jewels is an exhibition of jewelry designed by Dalí between 1941 and 1970, which can be seen at the Dalí Theatre and Museum, in Figueres. The exhibition includes the thirty-seven jewels of gold and precious stones from the Owen Cheatham collection, two jewels made later and the twenty-seven drawings and paintings on paper made by Dalí to design the jewels.

=== Salvador Dalí House Museum ===
The Salvador Dalí House Museum is a residence and workplace of Dalí, adapted from small fisherman's local houses in the town of Portlligat, where Dalí lived and often worked, from 1930 until 1982, after Gala's death. It is now a house museum and is also managed by the Gala-Salvador Dalí Foundation.

=== Castle of Púbol ===
The Castle of Púbol is a medieval fortification in the town of Púbol, in the municipality of La Pera, Baix Empordà, which was bought by Salvador Dalí in 1970 to be the house of his wife, Gala. Dalí directed the works of restoration and adaptation of the castle, giving it his own personal Surrealist touch. Gala lived there from 1970 to 1982, when she died. Dalí moved there afterwards, from 1982 to 1984, finishing his last painting there in 1983. After being seriously injured in a fire when he was sleeping, which required hospitalization, he moved to the Tower Galatea, in the Dalí Theatre and Museum, until his death, in 1989. The Castle of Púbol is now a visitable museum, since 1996.

== Government body ==
The Foundation is legally constituted as a private foundation managed by a board of trustees, made of 21 members, where 12 trustees have a lifetime presence and 9 institutional trustees are appointed by public administrations: the Spanish State, the Generalitat of Catalonia, the Figueres City Council and the City Council of Cadaques. Since 2017, the entrepreneur Jordi Mercader i Miró has presided over the Foundation. It currently manages an artistic heritage of approximately 200 million euros.

== The Foundation's museums ==
- Dalí Theatre and Museum (Figueres)
- Dalí·Jewels (Figueres)
- Salvador Dalí House Museum (Portlligat)
- Castle of Púbol (Púbol)
