= Historic site =

Official location where pieces of history have been preserved

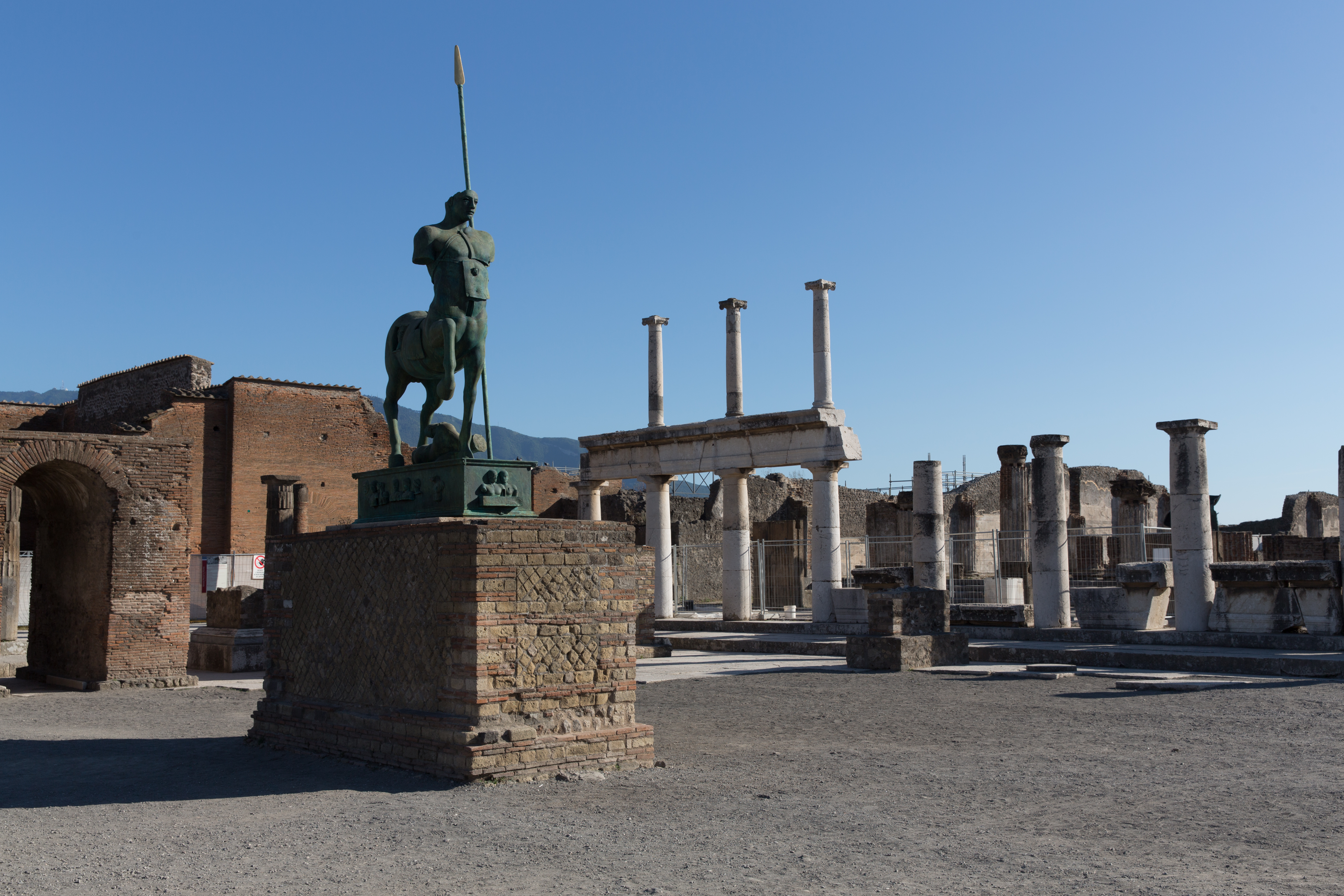
The ancient Roman city of Pompeii is known as a historic site in Europe.

A historic site or heritage site is an official location where pieces of political, military, cultural, or social history have been preserved due to their cultural heritage value. Historic sites are usually protected by law, and many have been recognized with official historic status. A historic site may be any building, landscape, site or structure that is of local, regional, national, or global significance. Usually this also means the site must be at least 50 years or older.

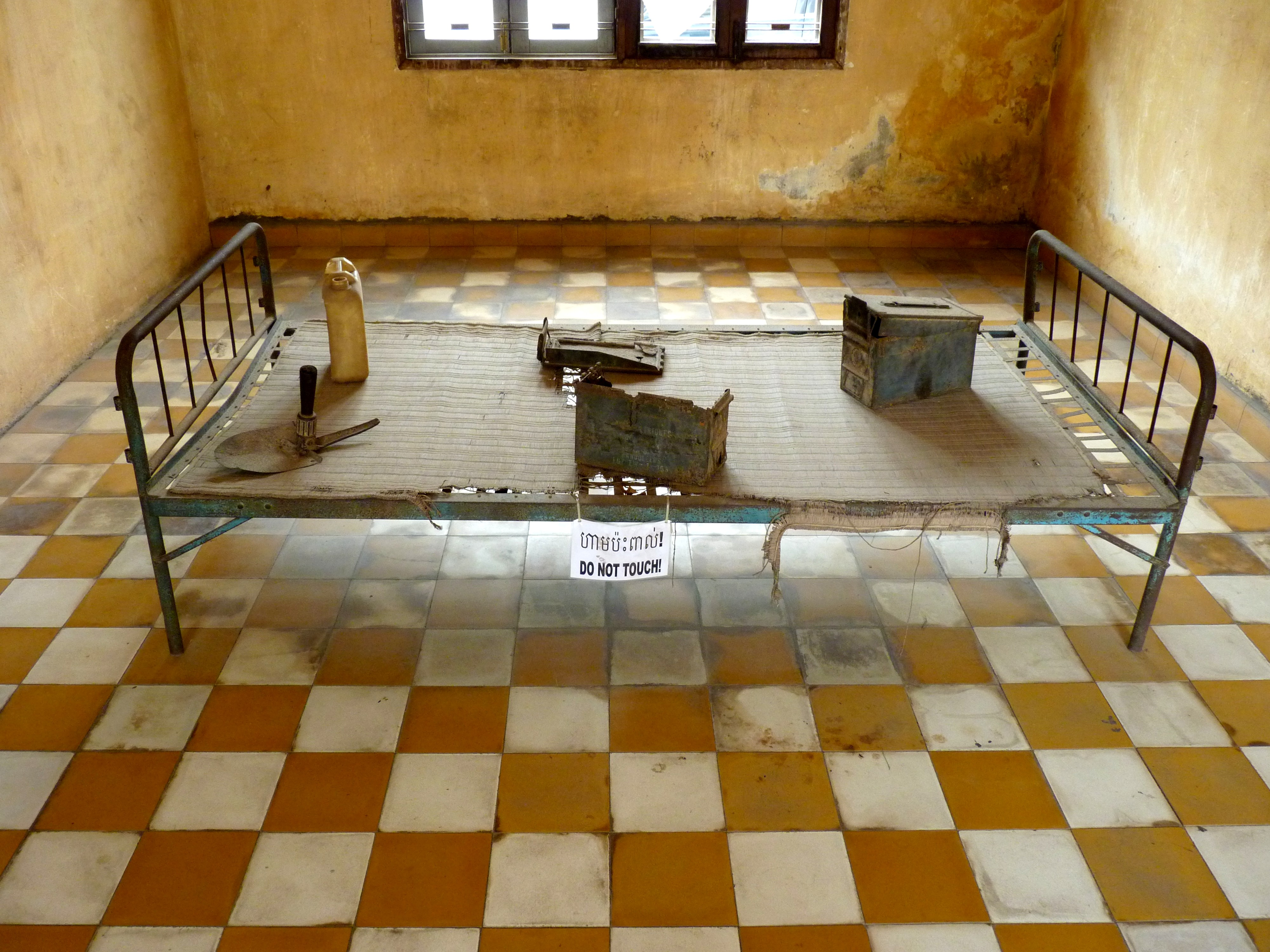
Iron bed in torture room at Tuol Sleng Genocide Museum.

== Classification, records and conservation ==
The conservation of historical heritage depends on the legislation of local governing bodies. In some, a national authority is responsible for the management of all classified sites, while in others regional entities are in charge.

According to civil law expert Estefanía Hernández Torres, whose doctoral thesis deals with historical heritage and property registration, "the protection of historical heritage is one of the main concerns of civilized societies. The assets that make up the cultural legacy are deserving of protection as they constitute a way of accessing culture". However, according to Hernández, protection can be complicated, especially in the case of property purchase or transfer since its protected status is sometimes unknown to its new owners.

The registries prepared by the different governments and international organizations (such as UNESCO or the European Union) are usually developed within the framework of very detailed legislation, which contemplates the relations between public authorities, conservation entities (institutional or private), the owners of the properties (in the cases of private property) and citizen collaboration. Beyond the historical and factual data, there are also observations on the historical, cultural or artistic significance of the site, in addition to the cost for its use and preservation.

Many historical sites can still be used by their owners (ex: homes, hotels, museums), even with the conditions from the site's overseeing body. Many times, these conditions are part of the purchase or rental contract, and their fulfillment is essential to be able to keep the property. One such condition may be periodic control visits by the corresponding conservation entity. In other cases, when it comes to private property in the possession of an individual prior to its classification, the conservation and rehabilitation tasks, or at least their financing, fall to public authorities and conservation entities. In almost all cases, reform and renovation works on the property (both internal and external) that are not part of the rehabilitation and recovery of historical elements are strictly prohibited.

== Social and tourist functions ==
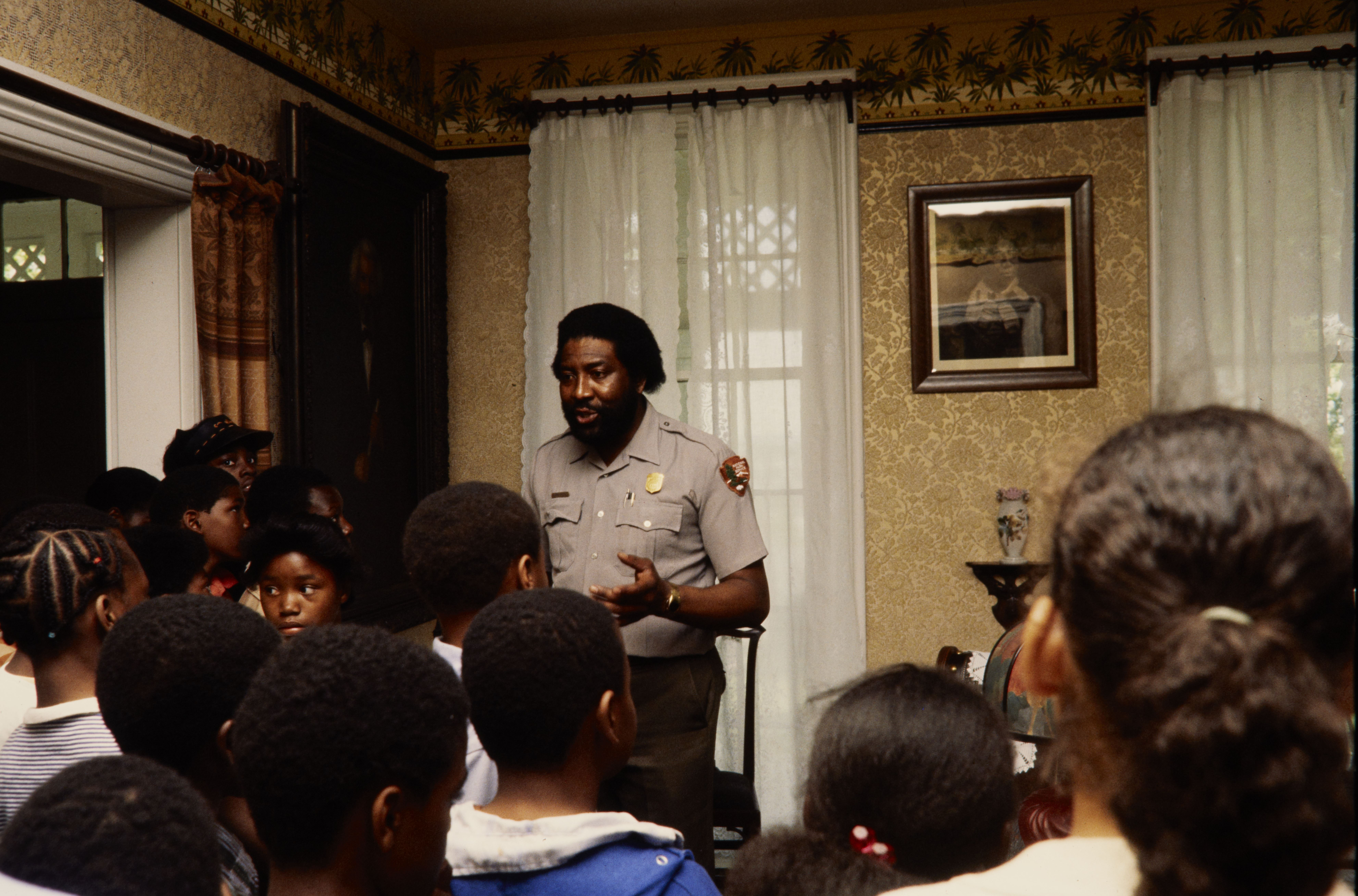
NPS employee talking to a group of students inside the Frederick Douglass National Historic Site in Washington, D.C.

Historical heritage has important social significance and function. House museums are common, being former homes of famous people (artists, pioneers, soldiers, politicians, businessmen, etc.) who have exerted a great influence on local, national or international history and folklore. These houses are usually preserved in their original state (when the people in question still lived in them), preserving their furniture, belongings, decorative elements and work tools. Some examples are the Salvador Dalí House Museum in Portlligat, Spain, the Freud museum houses in various European cities, or the Ben-Yehuda House in Jerusalem, Israel.

According to Joaquin Saúl García, Professor of Geography at the University of Castilla-La Mancha in Spain, "in recent years, cultural heritage has become the foundation of a tourist trend—cultural tourism—that, despite its long history documented in the well-known travel books from the 18th and 19th centuries, it wasn't until the end of the 20th century that it appeared as a way of traveling where the objective is knowledge of culture and diversity ...". García affirms that the relationship between heritage and tourism is currently very close, which contributes a great extent to the conservation of historical sites through revenue and in sustainable development.

Historic sites and heritage sites are often maintained for members of the public to be able to visit, with some offering tours or running visitors' centers. Historic buildings and spaces also often include a map with a description of the place for visitor orientation.

== UNESCO World Heritage Sites ==
A World Heritage Site is a historic site with legal protection by an international convention administered by the United Nations Educational, Scientific and Cultural Organization (UNESCO).

As of June 2023, a total of 1,157 World Heritage Sites (900 cultural, 218 natural, and 39 mixed properties) exist across 167 countries.

World Heritage Sites often attract large amounts of visitors. The most visited sites are the Forbidden City, China, with 14 million annual visitors, Gulangyu, China, with 12.4 million annual visitors, and the Great Smoky Mountains, United States, with 11 million annual visitors.

== Preservation in the United States ==
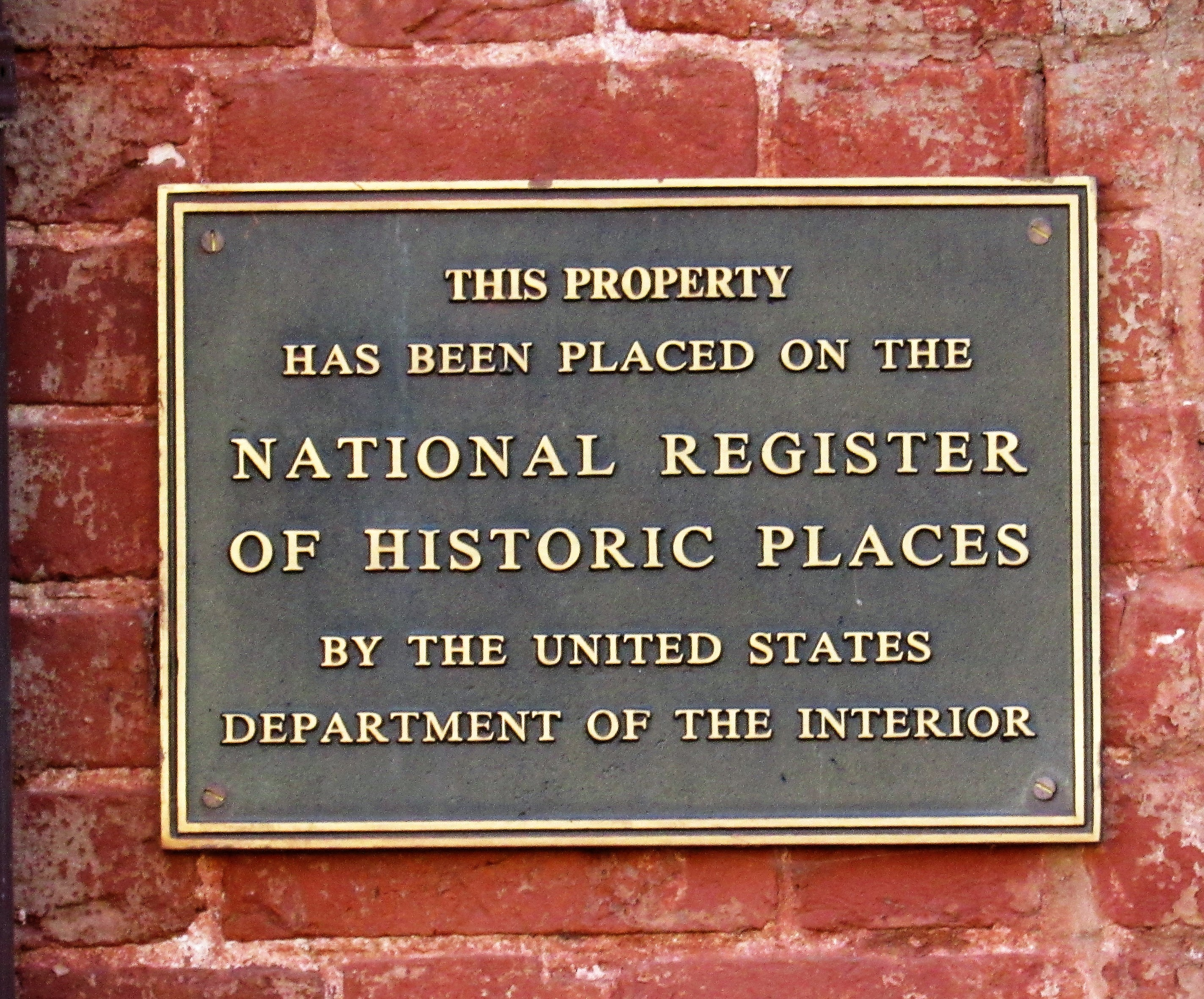
Bronze NRHP plaque mounted on historic building.

In the United States, the National Register of Historic Places keeps track of over 90,000 sites of significance. Roughly three percent, or about 2,600, are formally recognized as National Historic Landmarks (NHLs), with New York, Massachusetts, and Pennsylvania featuring the most NHLs.

The U.S. National Park Service runs historic site preservation under the National Historic Preservation Act of 1966. Each state government has a State Historic Preservation Office to oversee NHL upkeep and review applications for new ones. In addition, all sites must first be approved by the National Park Service and its special advisory board, as well as the Secretary of the Interior, before being officially registered.

== Preservation in other regions ==
About 179 countries have a system of registering historic sites, whether for notation, preservation, or both. In addition, some regions such as Europe and the Caribbean have historic registries spanning multiple countries.

== See also ==
- Cultural property
- Heritage centre
- List of heritage registers
- Memory space (social science)
- National heritage site
- World Heritage Site
- National Historic Site of Canada
- Listed building (United Kingdom)
- National Historic Sites (United States)
- Revolutionary Sites (North Korea)
