= Crucifixion (Corpus Hypercubus) =

1954 painting by Salvador Dalí

- Artist: Salvador Dalí
- Year: 1954
- Medium: Oil on canvas
- Dimensions: 194.3 cm × 123.8 cm (76.5 in × 48.7 in)
- Location: Metropolitan Museum of Art, New York

Crucifixion (Corpus Hypercubus) is a 1954 oil-on-canvas painting by Salvador Dalí. A nontraditional, surrealist portrayal of the Crucifixion, it depicts Christ on a polyhedron net of a tesseract (hypercube). It is one of his best-known paintings from the later period of his career. It is displayed at the Metropolitan Museum of Art in New York City.

== Background ==
During the 1940s and 1950s Dalí's interest in traditional surrealism diminished and he became fascinated with nuclear science, feeling that "thenceforth, the atom was [his] favorite food for thought". The atomic bombing at the end of World War II left a lasting impression; his 1951 essay "Mystical Manifesto" introduced an art theory he called "nuclear mysticism" that combined his interests in Catholicism, mathematics, science, and Catalan culture in an effort to reestablish classical values and techniques, which he extensively utilized in Corpus Hypercubus.

That same year, to promote nuclear mysticism and explain the "return to spiritual classicism movement" in modern art, he traveled throughout the United States giving lectures. Before painting Corpus Hypercubus, Dalí announced his intention to portray an exploding Christ using both classical painting techniques along with the motif of the cube, and he declared that "this painting will be the great metaphysical work of [his] summer". Juan de Herrera's Treatise on Cubic Forms was particularly influential to Dalí.

== Composition and meaning ==
Corpus Hypercubus is painted in oil on canvas, and its dimensions are 194.3 cm × 123.8 cm (76.5 in × 48.75 in). Consistent with his theory of nuclear mysticism, Dalí uses classical elements along with ideas inspired by mathematics and science. Some noticeably classic features are the drapery of the clothing and the Caravaggesque lighting that theatrically envelops Christ, though like his 1951 painting Christ of Saint John of the Cross, Corpus Hypercubus takes the traditional biblical scene of Christ's Crucifixion and almost completely reinvents it. The union of Christ and the tesseract reflects Dalí's opinion that the seemingly separate and incompatible concepts of science and religion can in fact coexist. Upon completing Corpus Hypercubus, Dalí described his work as "metaphysical, transcendent cubism".

While he did attempt to distance himself from the Surrealist movement after his development of nuclear mysticism, in Corpus Hypercubus Dalí incorporates dreamlike features consistent with his earlier work, such as the levitating Christ and the giant chessboard below. Jesus' face is turned away from the viewer, making it completely obscured. The crown of thorns is missing from Christ's head as are the nails from his hands and feet, leaving his body completely devoid of the wounds often closely associated with the Crucifixion. With Christ of Saint John of the Cross, Dalí did the same in order to leave only the "metaphysical beauty of Christ-God". Dalí sets the painting at the bay of his hometown Port Lligat in Catalonia, which is also the setting of other paintings of his including The Madonna of Port Lligat, The Sacrament of the Last Supper, and Christ of Saint John of the Cross.

A viewer's eyes may quickly be drawn to the knees of Christ, which have a grotesque exaggeration of hyperrealistic detail. On close observation of the original painting, five different images of Dalí's wife Gala appear in Christ's right knee, and five different images of Dalí himself appear in the left knee; the most prominent two being Gala's back/neck/back of head with right arm extended upward, and Dalí's own face complete with his trademark upswept mustache. The additional embedded images are more difficult to see in low-quality reproductions or prints.

=== Tesseract ===
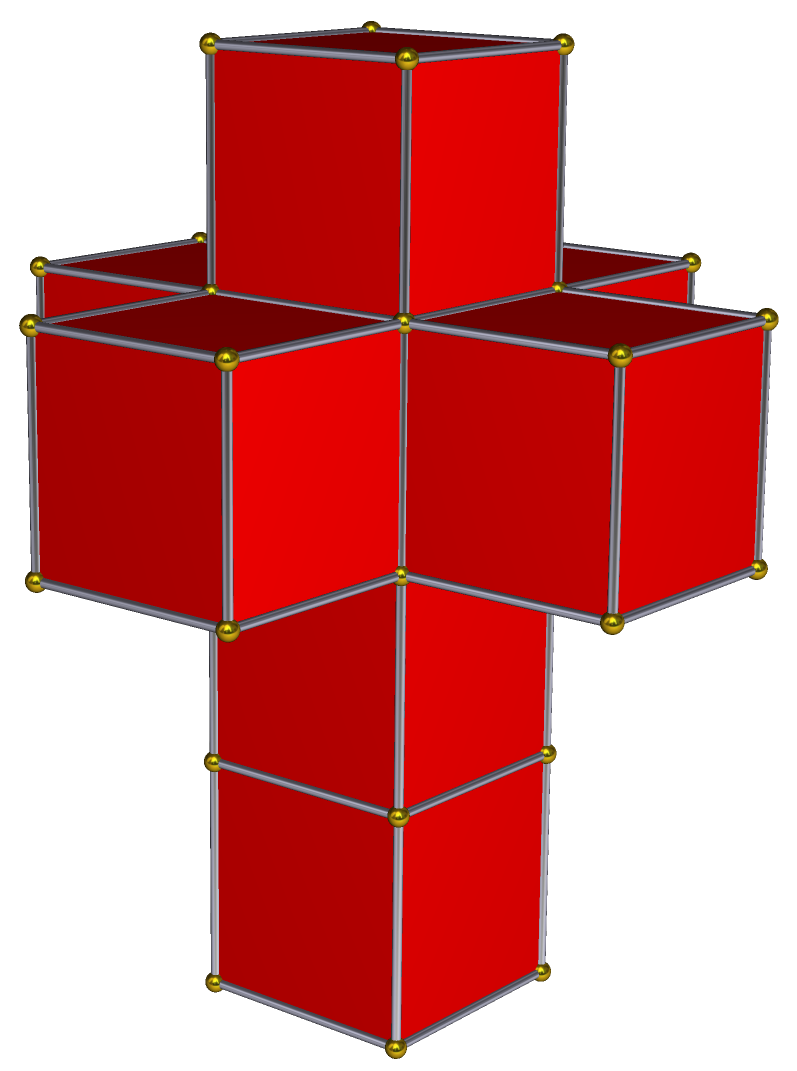
A net of a hypercube (tesseract)

The most striking change Dalí makes from nearly every other crucifixion painting concerns the cross, which he transforms into an unfolded net of a tesseract (also known as a hypercube). The unfolding of a tesseract into eight cubes is analogous to unfolding the sides of a cube into six squares. The use of a hypercube for the cross has been interpreted as a geometric symbol for the transcendental nature of God. Just as the concept of God exists in a space that is incomprehensible to humans, the hypercube exists in four spatial dimensions, which is equally inaccessible to the mind. The net of the hypercube is a three-dimensional representation of it, similar to how Christ is a human form of God that is more relatable to people.

The word "corpus" in the title can refer both to the body of Christ and to geometric figures, reinforcing the link Dalí makes between religion and mathematics and science. Christ's levitation above the earth could symbolize his rise above earthly desire and suffering. The motif of the cube is present elsewhere: Gala is standing on one, and the chessboard is made up of squares.

=== Gala ===
On the bottom left of the painting, Dalí painted his wife Gala as Mary Magdalene looking up at Jesus. Dalí thought of her as the "perfect union of the development of the hypercubic octahedron on the human level of the cube". He used her as a model because "the most noble beings were painted by Velázquez and Zurbarán. [He] only [approaches] nobility when painting Gala, and nobility can only be inspired by the human being."

== Reception ==
Fiona Macdonald describes the painting as showing a classical pose of Christ superimposed on a mathematical representation of the fourth dimension that is both unseeable and spiritual, considering it to be "arguably the greatest expression of [Dalí's] scientific curiosity". Gary Bolyer assesses it as "one of the most beautiful works of the modern era."

Novelist Ayn Rand declared Corpus Hypercubus to be her favorite painting, and she spent hours contemplating it at the Metropolitan Museum of Art. She felt a connection between John Galt's defiance over his spiritual ordeal in her novel Atlas Shrugged and Dalí's portrayal of Christ in the painting.

A reproduction of the painting is mentioned in J. G. Ballard's 1969 surrealist novel, The Atrocity Exhibition and in Robert J. Sawyer's 1998 science fiction novel, Factoring Humanity.

== Exhibitions ==
After being first exhibited in Rome in 1954, Corpus Hypercubus was acquired in 1955 by the Metropolitan Museum of Art in New York City, where it was renamed Crucifixion. After nearly 25 years, the painting was loaned to the Centre Georges Pompidou in Paris, the Daimaru Museum in Osaka, and the Tate Gallery in London from December 1979 until June 1980. Throughout the early and mid 1980s Crucifixion was loaned to museums in Japan, Mexico, and Spain, including the Palau Reial de Pedralbes in Barcelona, the only time the painting has been exhibited in Catalonia, Dalí's home region.

It was later loaned to the Staatsgalerie Stuttgart in Germany and the Pabellón de España at the Universal Exposition of Seville 1992 before being loaned long-term to the Salvador Dalí Museum (St. Petersburg, Florida) from 1993 to 1999. In 2000, it was loaned to the Wadsworth Atheneum in Connecticut from January to March and the Hirshhorn Museum and Sculpture Garden in Washington DC, as part of the traveling show "Dalí's Optical Illusions". In 2005, Corpus Hypercubus spent four months at the Philadelphia Museum of Art in a major retrospective of Dalí's work, and in 2006 it was loaned to the Museum Ludwig in Cologne, before returning to New York City.

== See also ==
- List of works by Salvador Dalí
