= Púbol =

Town in Catalonia, Spain

Coordinates: 42°00′52″N 2°58′58″E

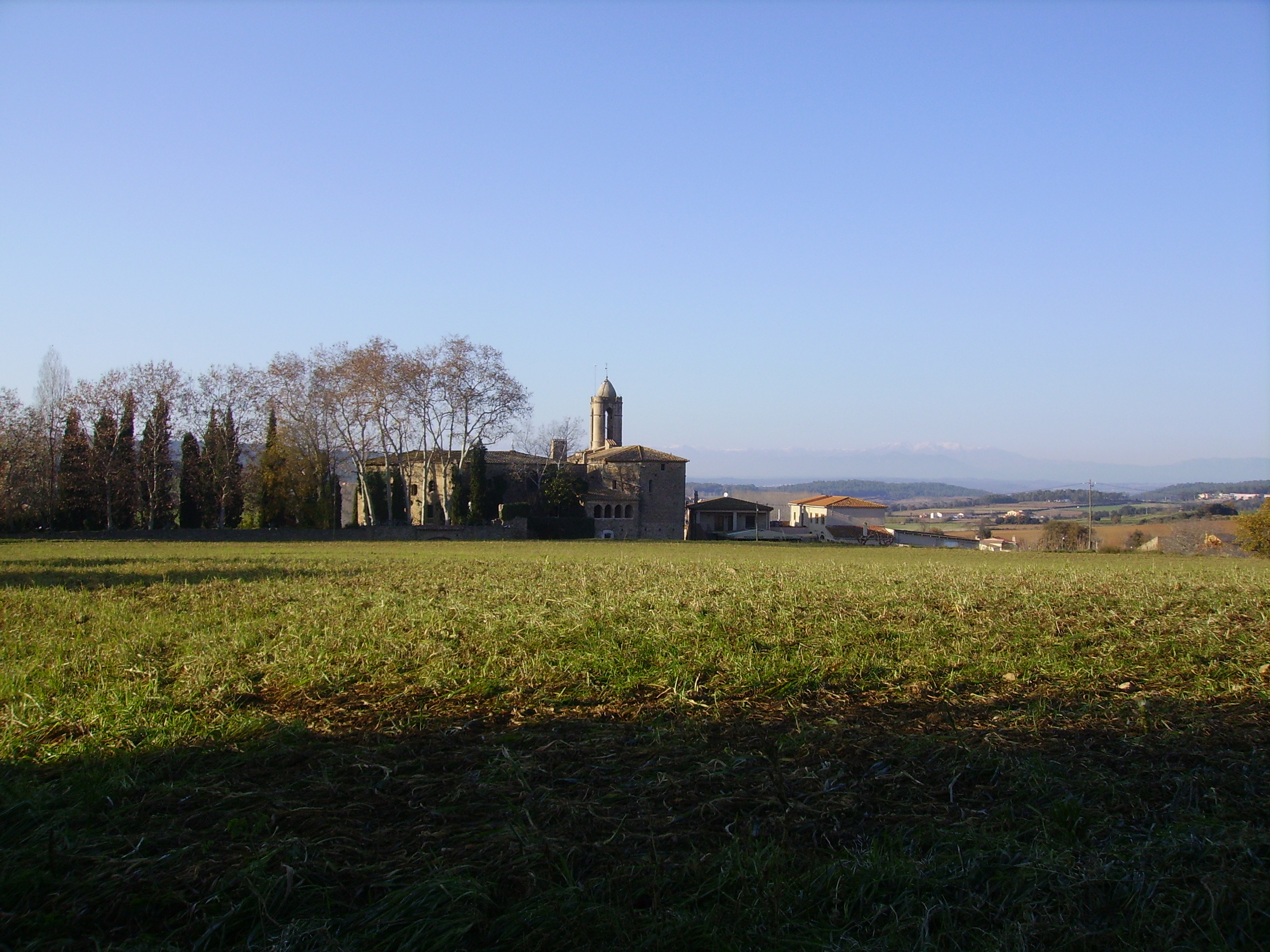
Púbol

Púbol is a small town located in the municipality of La Pera, in the comarca (county) of Baix Empordà, in the province of Girona, Catalonia, Spain.

The artist Salvador Dalí lived at the Castle of Púbol for a while, from 1982 to 1984; he was named Marquis of Dalí of Púbol because of that (spa., "Marqués de Dalí de Púbol").

In fact, Dalí had originally bought the castle for his wife, Gala, who lived there from 1970 to 1982, and allowed him to visit her, only with her written permission. After Gala died in 1982 at Púbol, where she rests in the crypt, Dalí moved to the premises for the first time; he would finish there his last painting, in 1983. In 1984, he was severely injured in a fire that started when he was sleeping, and had to be hospitalized. He moved afterwards to his museum, in Figueres, where he would spend his final years, until he died in a clinic in Barcelona in 1989.

The Castle of Púbol is a museum now. It contains many works of art by Salvador Dalí. Púbol, along with Cadaqués and Figueres, forms the so-called "Dalinian Triangle".
