= Dalí Jewels =

Art exhibition in Spain

Dalí·Jewels (Catalan: Dalí·Joies) is a permanent exhibition at the Dalí Theatre and Museum in Figueres, Catalonia, Spain, for which the architect Òscar Tusquets has completely refurbished a building annexed to the museum.

== History ==
The history of these jewels started in 1911. The first 22 were acquired by the US millionaire Cummins Catherwood. Salvador Dalí made the designs for the pieces on paper, with all kinds of details and great precision of shapes, materials, and colours, while they were made up in New York by the team of the Argentine-born silversmith Carlos Alemany under the close supervision of the artist himself. In 1958, they were acquired by the Owen Cheatham Foundation, a prestigious US foundation created in 1934 that lent the jewel collection out so that various charitable, educational, and cultural organisations could raise funds by exhibiting it, and finally deposited it at the Virginia Museum of Fine Arts in Richmond. Dalí, in collaboration with the Dutch American framemaker Henry Heydenryk, Jr. and Alemany, created special settings and illuminated frames for a traveling exhibition of the jewels sponsored by the Cheatham Foundation. The collection of jewels had already been exhibited temporarily at the Dalí Theatre-Museum in Figueres during August and September 1973, a year before the museum was inaugurated and while the artist was still alive. In 1981, the collection was acquired by a Saudi multimillionaire, and later by three Japanese entities, the last of which agreed to sell it to the Gala-Salvador Dalí Foundation. With the consultancy and supervision of the Spanish Gemmology Association, the collection was acquired by the Gala-Salvador Dalí Foundation from a Japanese organisation in 1999. Since that time, the association's experts, in collaboration with technicians from the foundation's Conservation Department and the Dalí Study Centre, have been cataloguing each of the pieces and designing a permanent exhibition for them.

== Collection ==
The two floors that house the collection of jewels have an entrance independent from the museum, and can therefore be visited separately. The exhibition includes the thirty-seven jewels in gold and precious stones from the old Owen Cheatham collection, two jewels made later, and the twenty-seven drawings and paintings on paper that Salvador Dalí made in designing the jewels. The whole forms an extensive collection of works carried out by the artist between 1941 and 1970, providing a perfect illustration of the various phases of his artistic development.

All the pieces in the collection are unique items, and the combination of materials, dimensions, and shapes used by Salvador Dalí makesc this a one-off set in which the artist managed to express in a unique way the wealth of his singular iconography. Gold, platinum, precious stones (diamonds, rubies, emeralds, sapphires, aquamarines, topazes, etc.), pearls, corals and other noble materials combine to form hearts, lips, eyes, plant and animal forms, religious and mythological symbols and anthropomorphic forms.

As well as designing the forms of the jewels, Salvador Dalí personally selected each of the materials used, not only for their colours or value but also for their meaning and the symbolic connotations of each and every one of the previous stones and noble metals. Some of the jewels that form part of this collection, such as The Eye of Time (1949), Royal Heart (1953), or The Space Elephant (1961), have become key works and are considered to be as exceptional as some of his paintings.
