= Castle of Púbol =

Museum in Catalonia, Spain

Gala Dalí Castle House-Museum
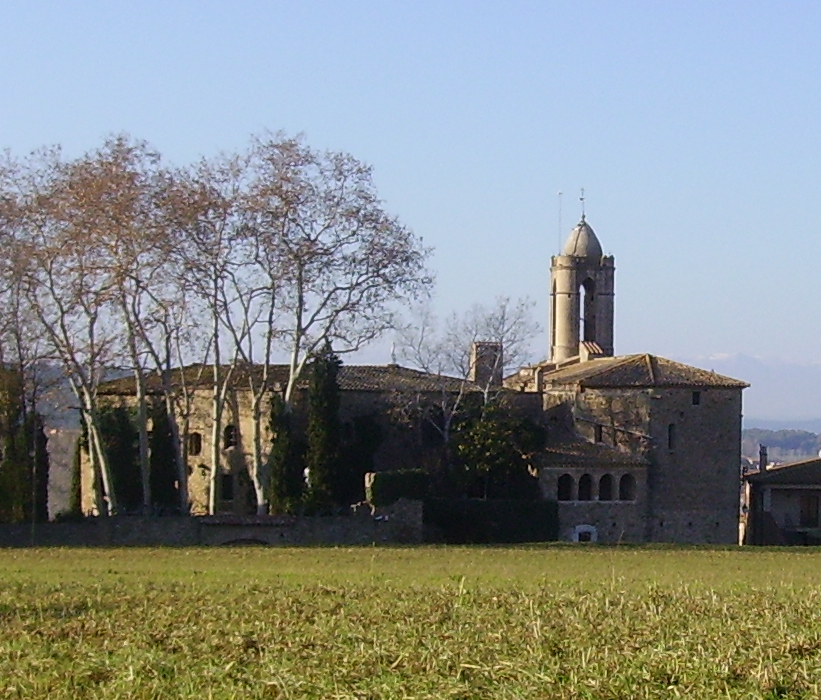
- View of the Castle and Church of Púbol

- Location within Province of Girona Location within Catalonia Location within Spain
- Established: 1996
- Location: Púbol
- Coordinates: 42°0′52.56″N 2°58′59.7″E
- Type: House-museum
- Website: Gala Dalí Castle House-Museum

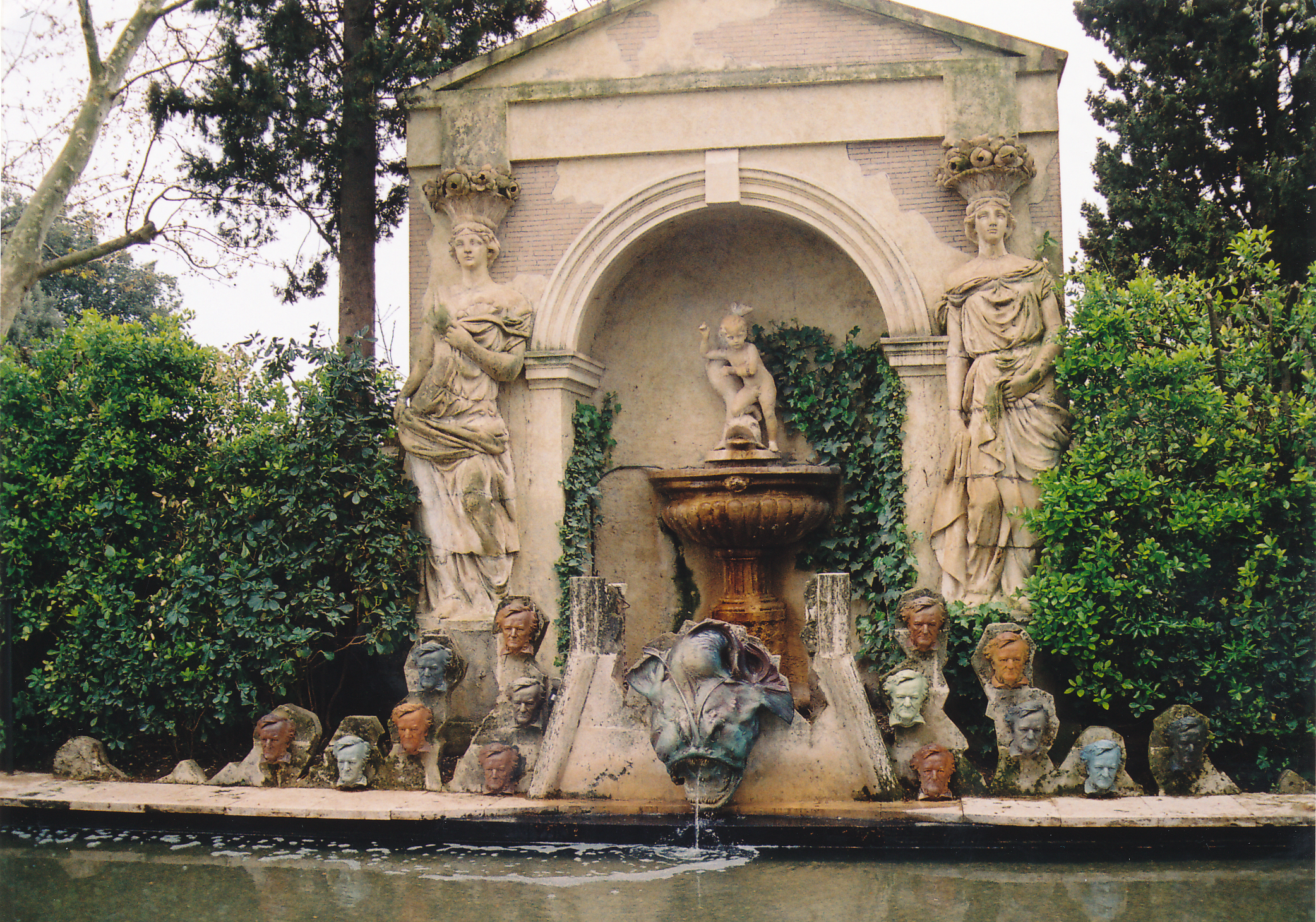
The heads of Richard Wagner at the garden of the castle

The Castle of Púbol or Gala Dalí Castle House-Museum (Catalan: Castell de Púbol or Casa-Museu Castell Gala Dalí; Spanish: Castillo de Púbol or Casa-Museo Castillo Gala Dalí), located in Púbol in the comarca of Baix Empordà, Girona, Catalonia, Spain, is a medieval building where the Spanish painter Salvador Dalí's enormous creative efforts were focused on a single person, his wife Gala, with the aim of providing her with a unique sanctuary and resting place. Gala is buried at the castle. Together with the Salvador Dalí House Museum in Portlligat and the Dalí Theatre and Museum in Figueres, they form the Empordà Dalinian triangle.

The castle is property of the Spanish State, although managed by the Gala-Salvador Dalí Foundation.

== Description ==
The Castle of Púbol is a Gothic-Renaissance fortification that originated in the 11th century, located in the town of Púbol, in the municipality of La Pera, which became the center of the barony of Púbol. It is protected as a Cultural Good of National Interest by the Autonomous Government of Catalonia.

Púbol Castle is located in the most pronounced area of the nucleus of La Pera, along with the church. It is formed by several bodies arranged around a patio, which retain much of the original structures and elements of the Gothic-Renaissance period. The main façade is the largest, and presents as a remarkable element, the midpoint archway with large stone voussoirs and gothic windows on the main floor. High elements (gothic and Renaissance windows, reliefs, portals with emblems, etc.) are also of interest, located in the various bodies of the building. The church of the castle is now the parish.

The basic structure of the current building, with three floors articulated from a tall and narrow central courtyard, must be located during the period of maximum splendor of the barony of Púbol: second half of the 14th century and the beginning of the 15th century. In Gothic-Renaissance style, it has undergone many transformations. The architectural ensemble of the Castle is formed by the current parochial church, the fortified mansion-palace surrounded by a walled garden and the attached building known as a tithing. It is surrounded by houses protected by the remains of the medieval wall.

The Church of Sant Pere de Púbol was built between 1327 and 1341 in Gothic style. It has a single nave covered with pointed vault and closed by polygonal apse. At the southern wall, there are side chapels, one dedicated to the Virgin Mary, with sculptural decoration from the 15th century and the other from 1631. In the 17th century, the choir was added, and in 18th century, the sacristy was built. The frontispiece is centered on a cover and a latex rose window of late-Gothic style. At the top there is the bell tower. Until 1936, the church kept the Altarpiece of Sant Pere de Púbol by Bernat Martorell, currently at the Girona Art Museum.

== History ==
The castle is mentioned in a document from 1065 in which Gaufred Bastons ceded his power, together with that of Cervià, to the Counts of Barcelona. In the middle of the 14th century the castle was acquired by Arnau de Llers. Later on, the castle was owned by the Cervià family, and in 1370 by Jaspert de Campllong. The current castle and church were built around 1420, in the days of the lords of Púbol, named Corbera, whose shield is visible in various parts of the building. Subsequently, it was owned by several different families, the Oms, the Tormo, the Batlle and the Miquel, who later became the Marquises of Blondel de l'Estany. The castle building, although weakened by subsequent reforms, retains much of the inner structures of the 14th and 15th centuries.

== Gala Dalí Castle House-Museum ==
Dalí had promised to buy a castle for Gala. He considered several castles in the region, finally deciding to buy her the Castle of Púbol, in 1969, which was then in a very poor state. Dalí directed the restoration works, creating entirely the new decoration of the castle, and giving it his own personal touch. He offered Gala the castle where she would spend time every summer from 1971 to 1980. He also agreed not to visit there without getting advance permission from her in writing.

After Gala's death in 1982, she was buried in the crypt that Dalí had prepared for her final place of rest. Dalí moved into the Castle for the first time the same year. He lived and worked there, finishing his last painting in 1983, until 1984, when a fire broke out in his bedroom under unclear circumstances. It was possibly a suicide attempt by Dalí, or simple negligence by his staff. Dalí was rescued by his friend and collaborator Robert Descharnes. He returned to Figueres, where he lived comfortably in the Galatea Tower of his Theater-Museum for his final years. Dalí planned to be buried at the crypt of the Castle of Púbol, near Gala, but he instead would be entombed at his final home.

Gala's private castle in Púbol was opened to the public as the Gala Dalí Castle House-Museum in 1996. It allows the visitor to discover a medieval building where Salvador Dalí materialized his creative effort on his wife, Gala Dalí. Currently, it is managed by the Gala-Salvador Dalí Foundation. Inside, it houses the paintings and drawings that Dalí gave for Gala to exhibit at the castle, a collection of haute couture dresses, the furniture and numerous objects that decorated the castle, and Gala's mausoleum. The garden is decorated with sculptures of elephants with long legs (a recurring motif in the artist's works), and the pool with busts of German composer Richard Wagner. The visitable areas are the salon of the shields, piano hall, Gala's room, Gala's bath, library, guest room, attic, dealer room, dining room, the tithes with the crypt and garage, as well as the garden and pool.

== See also ==
- Dalí Theatre and Museum – Museum of Dalí in his home town of Figueres, Catalonia, Spain
- Salvador Dalí Museum – in St Petersburg, Florida, United States
- Dalí Universe – in London, England
- Dalí Paris – in Paris, France
