= The Sacrament of the Last Supper =

1955 painting by Salvador Dalí

- Artist: Salvador Dalí
- Year: 1955
- Medium: Oil on canvas
- Dimensions: 166.7 cm × 267 cm (65.6 in × 105 in)
- Location: National Gallery of Art, Washington, D.C.

The Sacrament of the Last Supper is a painting by Salvador Dalí. Completed in 1955 after nine months of work, it remains one of his most popular compositions and is among the most-viewed works at the National Gallery of Art in Washington, DC.

== Background ==
The Sacrament of the Last Supper was completed during Dalí's post-World War II period, which is characterized by his increased interest in science, optical illusion and religion. During this time he became a devout Roman Catholic and simultaneously was astonished by the Atomic Age. Dalí himself labelled this era in his work "Nuclear Mysticism". He sought to combine traditional Christian iconography with images of disintegration. This is especially apparent in his piece The Madonna of Port Lligat, which was completed six years earlier.

The painting was not commissioned. After purchasing the Crucifixion and then giving it to the Metropolitan Museum of Art, collector and banker Chester Dale told Dalí he "had to do one more religious picture". Dale believed that this picture was "too important to keep for a few" and so donated it to the National Gallery. In a paragraph in the National Gallery's curatorial file but missing from previous published accounts, Dalí wrote of this picture:

The first Holy Communion on Earth is conceived as a sacred rite of the greatest happiness for humanity. This rite is expressed with plastic means and not with literary ones. My ambition was to incorporate to Zurbarán's mystical realism the experimental creativeness of modern painting in my desire to make it classic.

— Salvador Dalí, quoted in Nora Hamerman, "A new look at Dalí's Sacrament", Arlington Catholic Herald

== Description ==
The Sacrament of the Last Supper depicts thirteen figures gathered around a table. Assuming this painting is in line with traditional symbolism the figures are Christ and his 12 Apostles. Christ is the central figure in the painting placed directly on the horizon line. Behind him on the intersection point of perspective rests the source of sunlight, making the Christ figure the focus of the painting. He points upward directing the viewer's attention to a dominating transparent torso with arms stretched outward spanning the width of the picture plane. The scene's setting is within a transparent dodecahedron or twelve-sided space as perceived in the pentagon-shaped windowpanes behind the table. In the background is a familiar landscape of Catalonia, which Dalí has included in his paintings numerous times, one example being his famous 1931 painting The Persistence of Memory.

== Symbolism and interpretations ==
The combination of a classic Christian theme with the jarring techniques of surrealism captures the eye, as Dalí was able to do repeatedly with such works as The Temptation of St. Anthony, Christ of Saint John of the Cross, Crucifixion (Corpus Hypercubus), Nuclear Cross, and The Ecumenical Council, among others. The dimensions of the painting are in the golden ratio, as is the dodecahedron in the background. Dalí is quoted as saying that "the Communion must be symmetrical".

There have been many interpretations of this painting, but some critics have dismissed the piece, with the Protestant theologian Paul Tillich even calling it "junk". Michael Anthony Novak, a Catholic theologian, presented a paper on the subject of this piece in 2005. He proposes that Dalí's intention was not simply to paint the event of the last supper. He later stated:

Dalí's true intention, which he has masterfully accomplished on this canvas, is to remind us of what is occurring in every celebration of this mystery of bread and wine: that the worship here on Earth makes present the realities of worship in Heaven.

— Novak, "Misunderstood Masterpiece"

Other critics, like Novak, say, by looking at the title, the focus is not placed on one evening two thousand years ago. The lack of individualization of the apostles, their lack of focus on Christ and the almost dematerialized Christ reach beyond the fact of the event. Some say because Christ points to himself and the floating torso above him it could possibly be that he is referring to himself as already ascended to heaven.

== Mathematical composition ==
Being influenced by the works of Matila Ghyka, Dalí explicitly used the golden ratio in this painting. The dimensions of the canvas are a golden rectangle. A huge dodecahedron, in perspective so that edges appear in golden ratio to one another, is suspended above and behind Jesus and dominates the composition.

== See also ==
- Last Supper in Christian art
- List of works by Salvador Dalí

== Bibliography ==
- Hamerman, Nora. “A New Look at Dalí’s “Sacrament”. The Catholic Herald, (October 13, 2010) accessed June 2, 2013
- Novak, Michael Anthony. “Misunderstood Masterpiece.” America Magazine (November 5, 2012), accessed May 28, 2013
- Novak, Michael Anthony. "Salvador Dali’s The Sacrament of the Last Supper: A Theological Re-Assessment." Conference paper, 2005, accessed March 27, 2015
- Brown, David. “The Last Supper”. A Sermon preached in Trinity College Chapel, Cambridge (February 25, 2007) accessed May 28,2013, http://www.trinitycollegechapel.com/media/filestore/sermons/BrownLastSupper250207.pdf.
