= Salvador Dalí House Museum =

House museum in Portlligat, Catalonia, Spain

- Casa-Museu Salvador Dalí
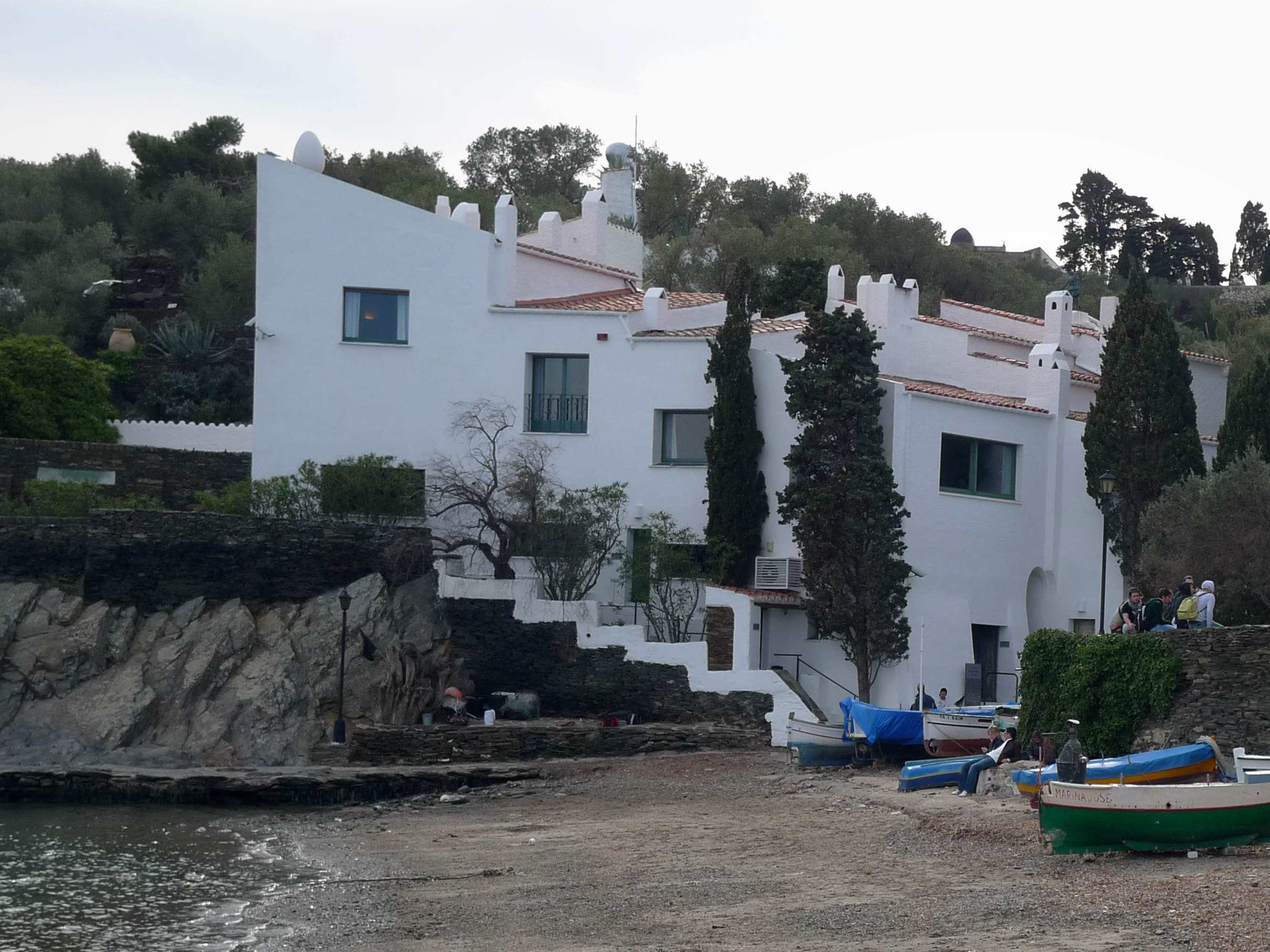
- Established: 1997
- Location: Portlligat, Cadaqués, Spain
- Coordinates: 42°17′35″N 3°17′10″E
- Type: House museum
- Website: Salvador Dalí House Museum

The Salvador Dalí House Museum (Catalan: Casa-Museu Salvador Dalí; Spanish: Casa-Museo Salvador Dalí) is a house museum in Portlligat, Cadaqués, Catalonia, Spain, where Spanish painter Salvador Dalí lived and worked, from 1930 to 1982. After the death of his wife, Gala Dalí, in 1982, he took up residence at Púbol Castle. The artist's former house started to be adapted to become a museum since 1994 and was officially inaugurated, in 1997. It is owned and managed by the Gala-Salvador Dalí Foundation. It has been a Site of Cultural Interest since 1997.

== History ==
Salvador Dalí's house was built on the site of an old fishermen's hut in Portlligat. In 1929, Dalí bought the first hut from Lidia Nogués de Costa and shortly afterwards acquired the second hut. The first works to adapt it as a residence were carried out by the bricklayer Joaquim Ferrer. In 1935, a new floor was built for the two huts, which were covered with a single tiled roof and a single window per unit, with views of the bay. In 1942, Gala and Dalí bought the hut located at the top end and which was used as a library, with furniture specially designed and built by the Cadaqués carpenter Joan Vehí. In 1954, they acquired the last hut to the northwest, which looks onto the riverbank from the cemetery. Later, in 1962, one of Gala's private rooms was built on the new floor.

After Gala's death in 1982, Dalí never returned to Portlligat. In 1989, the artist died and the house was left awaiting an initiative to adapt it to be a small museum complex, a work that began in 1994 under the direction of the architects Oriol Clos i Costa and José Ramos Illán. The new museum was finally inaugurated in 1997.

== Description ==
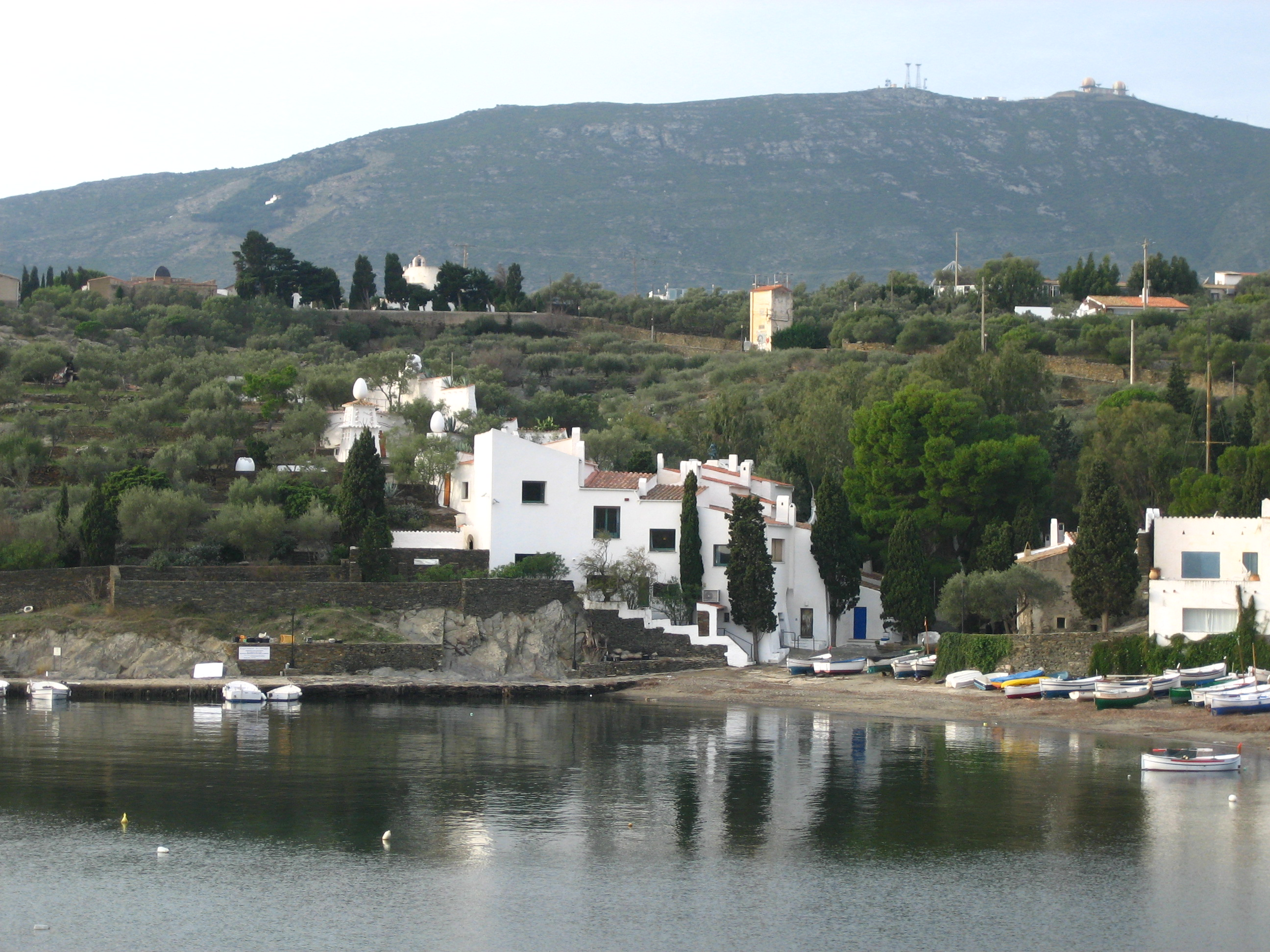
View of the Salvador Dalí House Museum (center), in Portlligat

The house, adapted from a number of small fisherman's huts, has a labyrinthine structure which from one point of departure, the Bear Hall, spreads out and winds around in a succession of zones linked by narrow corridors, slight changes of level, and blind passageways. All the rooms have windows of different shapes and proportions framing the same landscape that is a constant point of reference in Dalí's work: the Portlligat bay. The aesthetics of the house are dominated by the variegation of different elements, the most extreme surrealism and a kitsch atmosphere.

The house is divided into three areas, where the most intimate part of the Dalí family's life took place, the workshop, and the outdoor spaces.

The first of the rooms, the Bear Hall, is guarded by a bear, a gift from Edward James to the couple. The beast holds a lamp, but also serves as an umbrella stand, letter holder and musket player. Behind the bear there is a stuffed owl. These beasts demonstrate the artist's fondness for taxidermy. "Here, in this house, everything is stuffed," explained Dalí.

One of the most important rooms is the studio, where the artist spent long hours as he dedicated himself to his work with extreme seriousness. The quiet and well-lit room still contains easels, brushes, solvents and other gadgets.

Next to the workshop is the Model Room, with its tools and optical equipment. The most notable feature of this room is a small plaster bust of the Emperor Nero. This work served as inspiration for the painting Dematerialization of Nero's Nose (1947), created at a time wen Dalí was interested in nuclear fusion.

Like Salvador Dalí, his wife also had a private space in the home, called the Oval Room, where she read and received distinguished visitors. The room was built in 1961, is spherical and has reverberant acoustics. To access the Oval Room, the visitor must first cross Gala's boudoir and the Photograph Room, a dressing room with cupboards full of photos and magazine clippings, where the couple appears in the company of all kinds of people, demonstrating their great public activity.

The courtyard stands out on the outside, accessed through a labyrinth that hides a small summer dining room. The decorative elements of this area are two enormous cup-shaped planters and a reproduction of Ilisos, by Ancient Greek sculptor Phidias, created for the Parthenon, in Athens.

The back of the courtyard houses the swimming pool, built in 1967. It is possibly the most striking area of the house due to its abundant and surreal decoration, which includes a lip sofa, reproductions of Bibendum, swan-shaped fountains and Pirelli tyre posters.

Other elements that complete the whole decoration of the house and symbolize Dalí's personal touch are the countless eggs, the heads, the gallows dovecote and the sculpture Christ of the Debris, made from the remains of a flood.

== See also ==
- List of single-artist museums

== Gallery ==
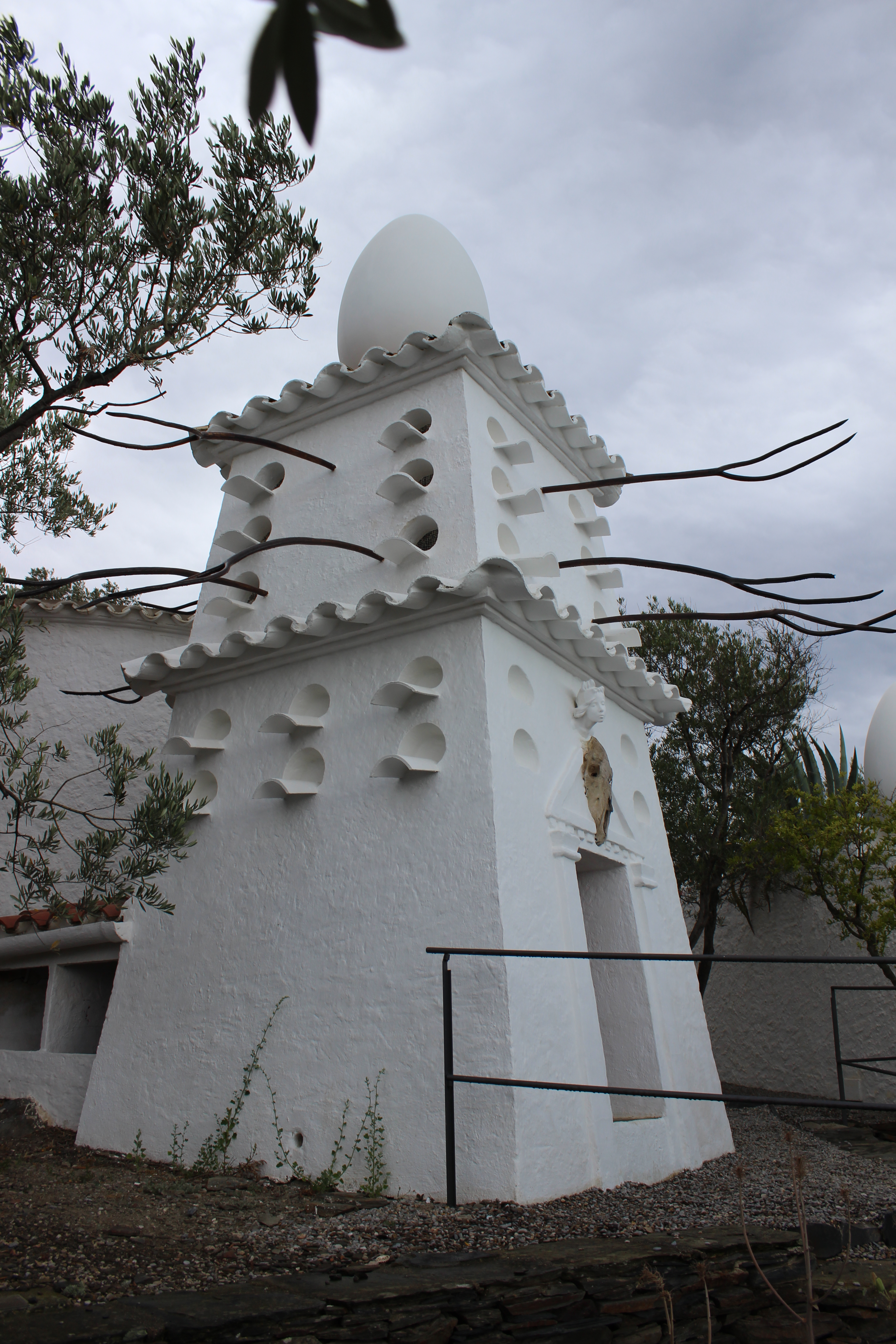

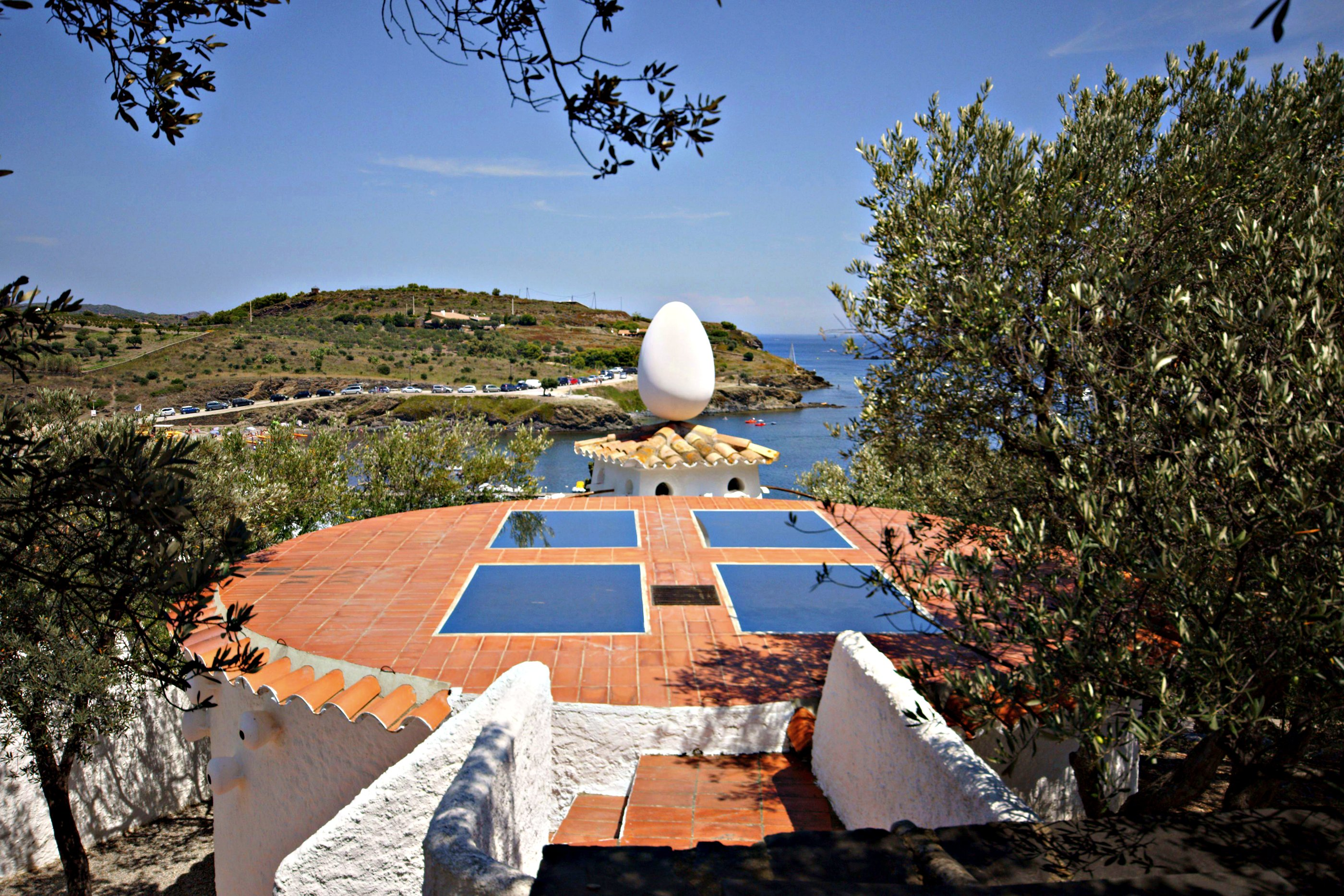

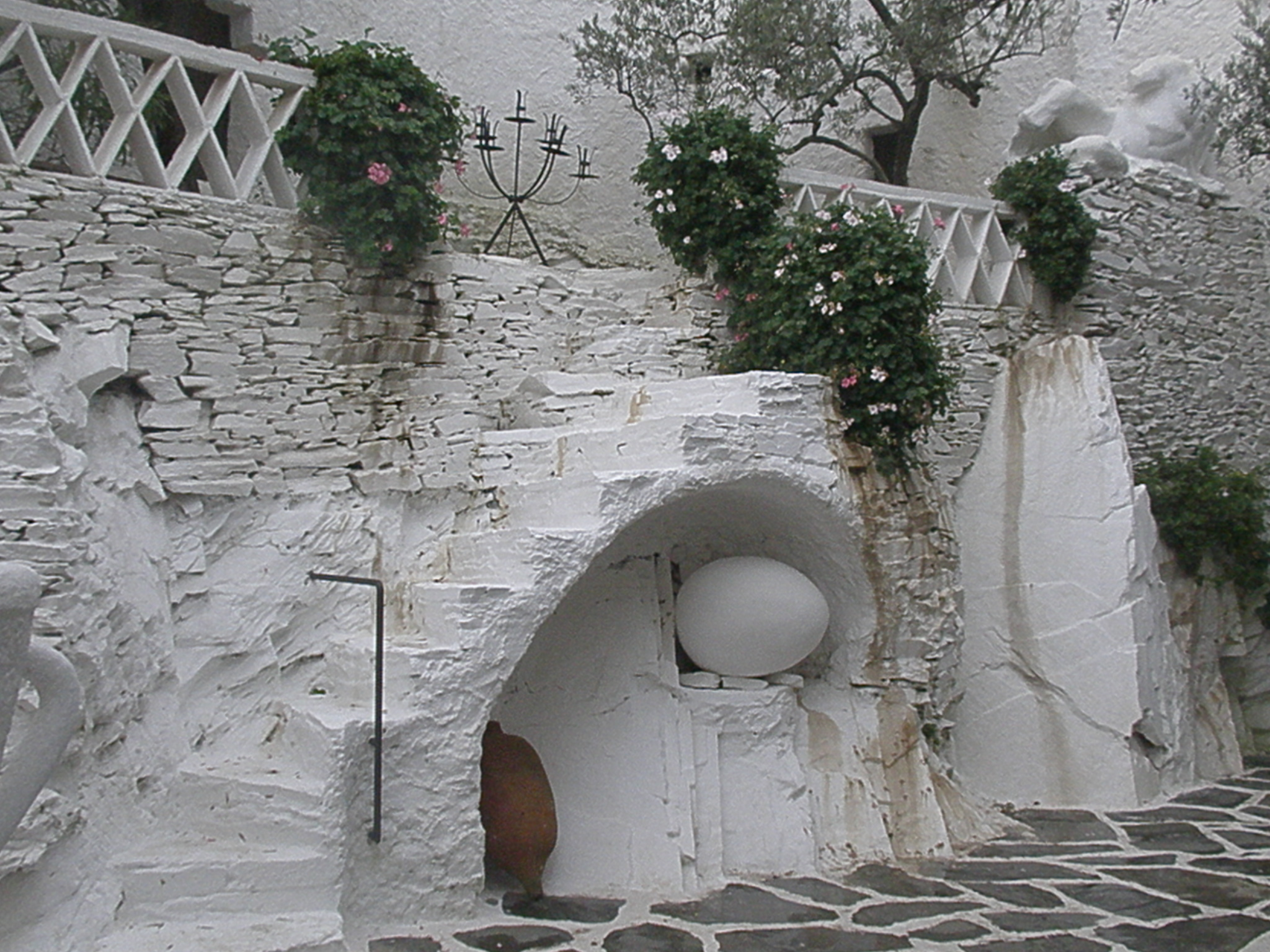
