= Dalí Seen from the Back Painting Gala from the Back Eternalised by Six Virtual Corneas Provisionally Reflected by Six Real Mirrors =

Painting by Salvador Dalí

Dalí Seen from the Back Painting Gala from the Back Eternalised by Six Virtual Corneas Provisionally Reflected by Six Real Mirrors is an oil painting on canvas executed in 1972–73 by the Spanish artist Salvador Dalí. It is in the permanent collection of Dalí Theatre and Museum in Figueres, Spain.

It is an example of the stereoscopic work that Dalí pursued during the 1970s. It includes a self-portrait reminiscent of that in Diego Velázquez's 1656 painting Las Meninas.

== See also ==
- List of works by Salvador Dalí
