= Russell M. Saunders =

Canadian gymnast and stunt man (1919–2001)

- Full name: Russell Maurice Saunders
- Born: 21 May 1919
- Died: 29 May 2001 (aged 82)

Gymnastics career
- Discipline: Men's artistic gymnastics

Russell Maurice "Rusty" Saunders (May 21, 1919 – May 29, 2001) was a stunt man and acrobat.

Saunders did Alan Ladd's fight scene in Shane. He also doubled for Gene Kelly in Singin' in the Rain and An American in Paris. He was in many other famous movies from as early as Hitchcock's Saboteur in 1942 to as late as Mississippi Burning in 1988.

Saunders was lauded by other famous stuntmen, such as Brayton Yerkes and Gary Morgan. Fay Alexander called him, "without a doubt the best all-around acrobat I've ever known."

Saunders was the model for Salvador Dalí's painting Christ of Saint John of the Cross. The painting shows Jesus from the viewpoint of God the Father (from above); Saunders was suspended from the ceiling to allow Dalí to visualise the human body under the stress of crucifixion.

Saunders was famous for performing at Muscle Beach in Santa Monica, California, and for giving free lessons to children. "This has to be the only place in the world where someone can just walk up and receive free gymnastic instruction from pros", Saunders told a reporter in 1986. Saunders was not a weightlifter, though. Instead, he 'preferred to lift girls'.
