= La Pera =

- Municipality
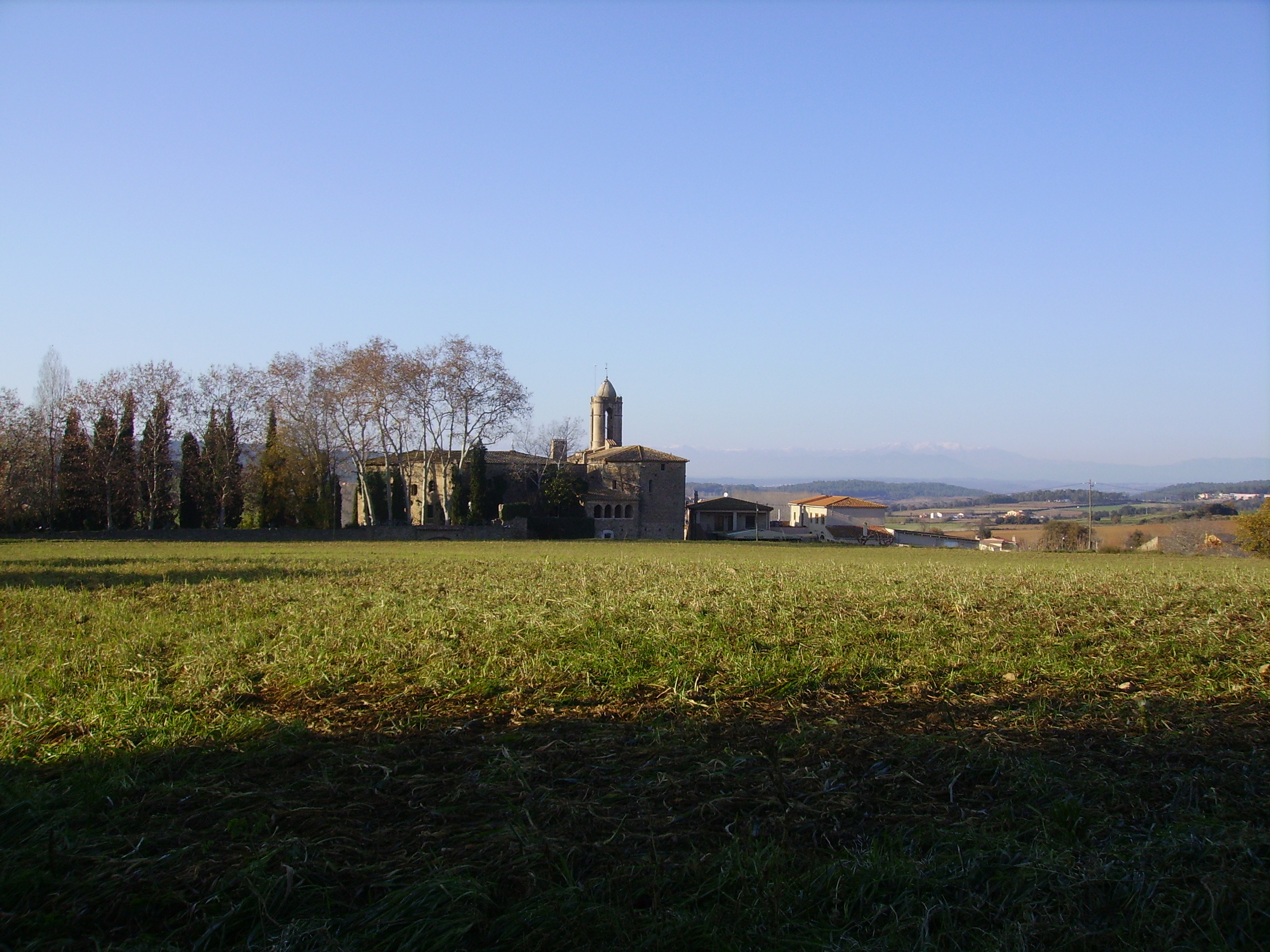
- Castle of Púbol.

- Coat of arms

- Location in Catalonia La Pera (Spain)
- Coordinates: 42°1′22″N 2°58′31″E
- Country: Spain
- Community: Catalonia
- Province: Girona
- Comarca: Baix Empordà

Government
  - Mayor: Maria Lluïsa Teixidor Pagès (2015)

Area
  - Total: 11.5 km^{2} (4.4 sq mi)
- Elevation: 89 m (292 ft)

Population (2025-01-01)
  - Total: 447
  - Density: 38.9/km^{2} (101/sq mi)
- Demonym: Perenc
- Postal code: 17120
- Website: www.lapera.cat

La Pera (Old Catalan for 'the Rock'; Catalan pronunciation: [lə ˈpɛɾə]) is a municipality in Catalonia, north-eastern Spain. It includes the village of Púbol. The castle of Púbol includes a Gothic church with an altarpiece by Bernat Martorell; 20th-century painter Salvador Dalí resided here with his wife.
