= Christ of Saint John of the Cross =

1951 painting by Salvador Dalí

- Artist: Salvador Dalí
- Year: 1951
- Medium: Oil on canvas
- Dimensions: 205 cm × 116 cm (80.7 in × 45.67 in)
- Location: Kelvingrove Art Gallery and Museum, Glasgow

Christ of Saint John of the Cross is a painting by Salvador Dalí made in 1951 which is in the collection of the Kelvingrove Art Gallery and Museum, Glasgow. It depicts Jesus Christ on the cross in a darkened sky floating over a body of water complete with a boat and fishermen. Although it is a depiction of the crucifixion, it is devoid of nails, blood, and a crown of thorns, because, according to Dalí, he was convinced by a dream that these features would mar his depiction of Christ. Also in a dream, the importance of depicting Christ in the extreme angle evident in the painting was revealed to him.

== Title ==
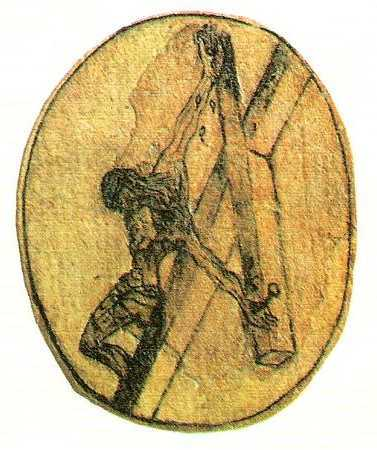
Crucifixion sketch by St. John of the Cross, c. 1550, which inspired Dalí

The painting is known as the Christ of Saint John of the Cross, because its design is based on a drawing by the 16th-century Spanish friar John of the Cross. The composition of Christ is also based on a triangle and circle (the triangle is formed by Christ's arms; the circle is formed by Christ's head). The triangle, since it has three sides, can be seen as a reference to the Trinity, and the circle may be an allusion to Platonic thought. The circle represents unity.

== Inspiration ==
On the bottom of his studies for the painting, Dalí explained its inspiration: "In the first place, in 1950, I had a 'cosmic dream' in which I saw this image in colour and which in my dream represented the 'nucleus of the atom.' This nucleus later took on a metaphysical sense; I considered it 'the very unity of the universe,' the Christ!"

In order to create the figure of Christ, Dalí had Hollywood stuntman Russell M. Saunders suspended from an overhead gantry, so he could see how the body would appear from the desired angle and also envisage the pull of gravity on the human body. The depicted body of water is the bay of Portlligat, in Catalonia, Spain, Dalí's residence at the time of the painting.

== History ==
The painting and intellectual property rights were acquired for Glasgow Corporation in 1952 by Tom Honeyman, then the Director of Glasgow Museums. Honeyman bought the painting for £8,200, a price considered high at the time although it was less than the £12,000 catalogue price, and included the copyright, which has earned Glasgow Museums back the original cost many times over.

The purchase was controversial and a petition against it, arguing that the money should be spent on exhibition space for local artists, was presented to the Corporation by students at Glasgow School of Art. The controversy caused Honeyman and Dalí to become friends, corresponding with each other for many years after the original acquisition.

The painting first went on display at the city's Kelvingrove Art Gallery and Museum on 23 June 1952. In 1961, a visitor attacked the painting with a stone and tore the canvas with his hands. It was restored over several months by conservators at Kelvingrove and returned to public display. In 1993, the painting was moved to the city's St Mungo Museum of Religious Life and Art, returning to Kelvingrove for the latter's reopening in July 2006.

In 2022, the painting was loaned for a five-month period to The Auckland Project in Bishop Auckland, County Durham to be displayed alongside El Greco's painting of Christ on the Cross.

== Critical reception ==
Christ of Saint John of the Cross has continued to generate controversy. At the time of its purchase by Honeyman, the verdict by modern art critics was that producing such a traditional painting was a stunt by an artist already famous for his surrealist art.

The picture was voted Scotland's favourite painting in 2006, with 29% of the vote. In 2009 The Guardian art critic, Jonathan Jones, described it as "kitsch and lurid", but noted that the painting was "for better or worse, probably the most enduring vision of the crucifixion painted in the 20th century."

In May 2013, in BBC Radio 4's Great Lives, British poet John Cooper Clarke described the image as being utterly different from any other image of the crucifixion, as the angle of view conveys the hanging pain of this method of execution, whilst hiding the ordinarily clichéd facial expressions normally seen in such depictions.

== See also ==
- List of works by Salvador Dalí
