= Eurotophobia =

Fear or dislike of female genitalia

- Specialty: Psychology

Eurotophobia is the aversion to, fear of, or dislike of female genitalia. Eurotophobia originates from the Greek eurṓs, meaning "vulva," combined with phobia, meaning "fear" or "aversion."

== Semantics ==
A term whose meaning is synonymous with Eurotophobia is Kolpophobia; Kolpophobia derives from the Greek words Kolpos, meaning "womb" or "fold" (often used to refer to the vagina). The term literally translates to "fear of the vagina" or "fear of the womb".

The male counterpart that analogously corresponds with this condition is called Phallophobia.

== Origin ==
Such an exhibit of detestation for the female genitalia can originate from some innate inherency, or learned from frequent denunciations of one's aesthetic appearance and aberrating comments during childhood. Sometimes eurotophobia is a spin-off of aversion to perceived by-products of the female genitalia, such as discharge or mucus. The condition can manifest itself in both men and women and is at times triggered by some strenuous event. This phenomenon has also been observed in medical students, particularly those in the field of obstetrics, at times leading to dropping out. According to the online Romanian women's magazine Ele, the appropriation of this condition by women may lead to various symptoms including depression and self-harm and that it originates from a highly prudish and puritanical upbringing. Other explanations posit the transmission of urban legends such as vagina dentata or Freudian concepts such as castration anxiety. Eurotophobes may also have developed their condition after being molested by a female.

== Peculiarities ==
Although an average individual may have an aversion to particular bodyparts, the hallmark of eurotophobia is that it exceeds the disinclinations shown by most people, and is a trait that can inauspiciously affect both men and women. The condition is sometimes linked to erotophobia and can affect an individual's confidence in social and professional interactions. The condition can emanate from both a direct antipathy, to a woman's vicarious perception of what others, such as a spouse, might think of her vulva. Symptoms include anxiety, inhibition, distractions, anaphrodisia and an inability to construct a romantic relationship. People with such inclinations may express a compounded desire to substitute audible mentions of the vulva with euphemisms. The extent of the condition varies from person to person, with some feeling a sense of repulsion, others reacting only once evoked, avoidance of thinking about female sex organs or a sense of deep fear. Eurotophobia has also been given an account by Planned Parenthood in the lexicon section of their publications. Rather than being an anomaly, some historical works point to cultures wherein eurotophobic behavior was mainstream, such as those where couples would avoid copulating in illuminated areas to ensure the vulva remained out of sight. Fear or embarrassment while discussing the vagina manifests itself in some women with health problems, which may impede diagnosing or tackling certain medical conditions.

== See also ==
- Phobia
