= The Madonna of Port Lligat =

Two paintings by Salvador Dali

- Artist: Salvador Dalí
- Year: 1949
- Medium: Oil on canvas
- Dimensions: 49.5 cm × 38.3 cm (19 1/4 in × 14 3/4 in)
- Location: Marquette University, Milwaukee

The Madonna of Port Lligat is a pair of paintings by Salvador Dalí. The first was created in 1949, measures 49.5 × 38.3 centimetres (19.5 × 15.0625 in), and is housed at the Haggerty Museum of Art at Marquette University in Milwaukee, Wisconsin, USA. Dalí presented it to Pope Pius XII in an audience for approval, which was granted. Dalí created a second painting in ca. 1950 with the same title and same themes, with various poses and details changed, measuring 275.3 × 209.8 centimetres (108.4 × 82.6 in). The 1950 Madonna is exhibited at the Fukuoka Art Museum in Japan.

== Description ==
The paintings depict a seated Madonna (posed by Dalí's wife, Gala) with the infant Christ on her lap. Both figures have rectangular holes cut into their torsos, suggestive of their transcendent status. In the 1950 version Christ has bread at the center of his figure. They are posed in a landscape, with features of the coast of Portlligat, Catalonia, in the background. Several surrealist details are included: nails, fish, seashells, and an egg. The 1949 Madonna has a sea urchin; the 1950 Madonna has a rhinoceros and figures of angels, and is also posed by Gala.

== Cultural references ==
A poem and book based on the painting, The Virgin of Port Lligat, by Fray Angelico Chavez, was selected as one of the best books of 1959 by the Catholic Library Association.

In Larry Niven's 1973 novel Protector, one of the main characters has this painting on his spacesuit.

== See also ==
- List of works by Salvador Dalí
