= Dalí Theatre and Museum =

Biographical museum in Spain

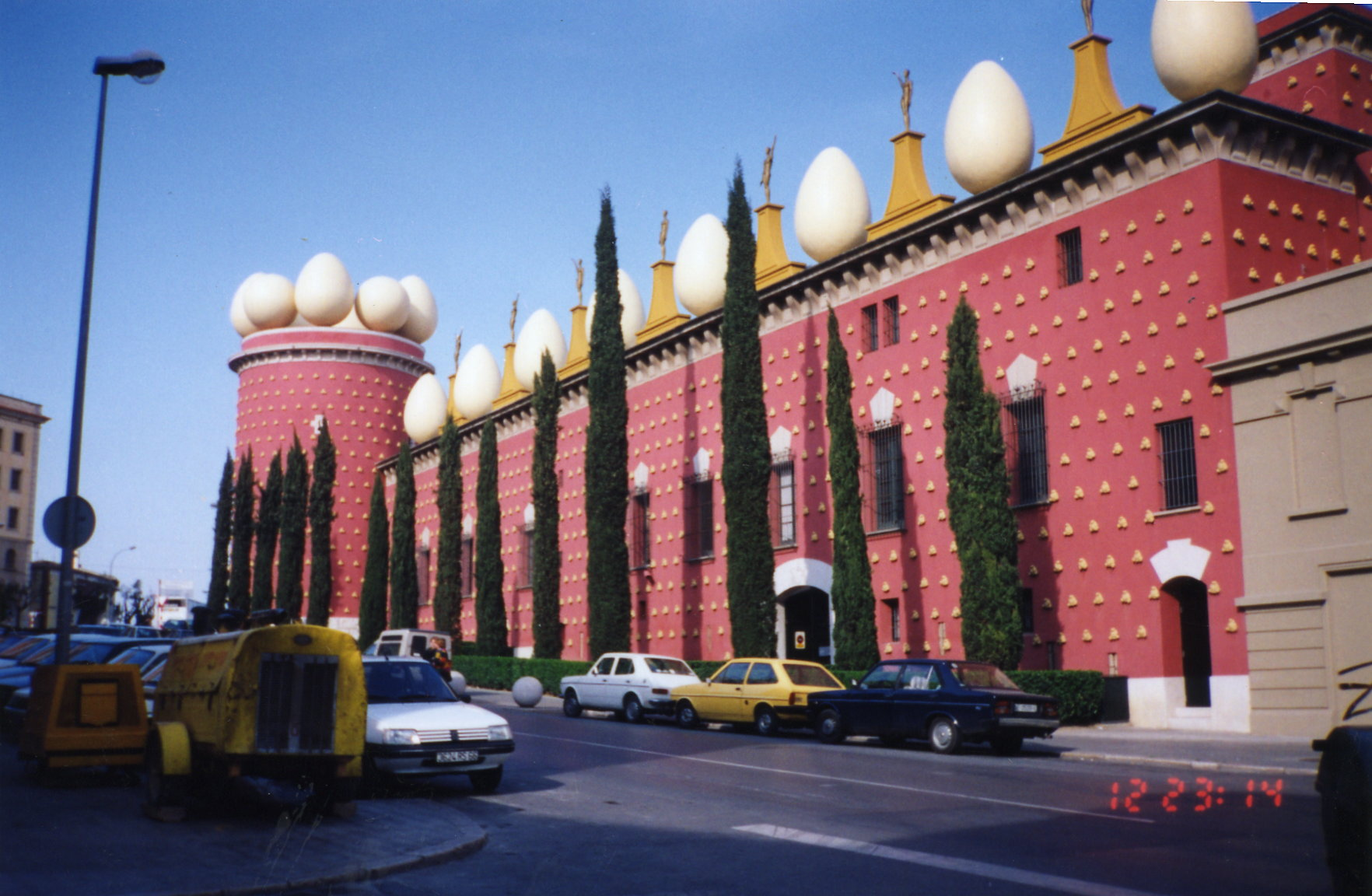
- The museum façade is topped by a series of giant eggs.
- Established: 28 September 1974
- Coordinates: 42°16′05″N 2°57′34″E
- Type: Art museum
- Website: www.salvador-dali.org/en/

The Dalí Theatre and Museum (Catalan: Teatre-Museu Dalí, IPA: [teˈatɾə muˈzɛw ðəˈli]; Spanish: Teatro-Museo Dalí) is a museum dedicated to the artist Salvador Dalí in his home town of Figueres, in Catalonia, Spain. Salvador Dalí lived there from 1984 to 1989, and is buried in a crypt below the stage. The museum received 1,368,755 visitors in 2016.

== Museum ==
I want my museum to be a single block, a labyrinth, a great surrealist object. It will be [a] totally theatrical museum. The people who come to see it will leave with the sensation of having had a theatrical dream.

— Salvador Dalí, from The Dalí Theatre-Museum

The heart of the museum is the town's theatre that Dalí knew as a child. It was where one of the first public exhibitions of young Dalí's art was shown. The old theatre was burned during the Spanish Civil War and remained in a state of ruin. In 1960, Dalí and the mayor of Figueres decided to rebuild it as a museum dedicated to the town's most famous son. In 1968, the city council approved the plan, and construction began the following year. The architects were Joaquim de Ros i Ramis and Alexandre Bonaterra. The museum opened on September 28, 1974, and it expanded through the mid-1980s. The museum now includes buildings and courtyards adjacent to the old theatre.

The museum displays the single largest and most diverse collection of works by Salvador Dalí, the core of which was from the artist's personal collection. In addition to Dalí paintings from all decades of his career, there are Dalí sculptures, three-dimensional collages, mechanical devices, and other curiosities from Dalí's imagination. A highlight is a three-dimensional anamorphic living-room installation with a Mae West Lips Sofa, a custom sofa that looks like the face of Mae West when viewed from a certain spot.

The museum also houses a small selection of works by other artists collected by Dalí, ranging from El Greco and Bougereau to Marcel Duchamp and John de Andrea, In accordance with Dalí's specific request, a second-floor gallery is devoted to the work of his friend and fellow Catalan artist Antoni Pitxot, who also became director of the museum after Dalí's death.

A glass geodesic dome cupola crowns the stage of the old theatre, and Dalí is buried in a crypt below the stage floor. The space formerly occupied by the audience has been transformed into a courtyard open to the sky, with Dionysian nude figurines standing in the old balcony windows. A Dalí installation inside a full-sized car, inspired by Rainy Taxi (1938), is parked near the centre of the space.

== Art collection ==
The Dalí Theatre and Museum holds the largest collection of major works by Dalí in a single location. Some of the most important exhibited works are Port Alguer (1924), The Spectre of Sex-appeal (1932), Soft self-portrait with grilled bacon (1941), Poetry of America—the Cosmic Athletes (1943), Galarina (1944–45), Basket of Bread (1945), Leda Atomica (1949), Galatea of the Spheres (1952), Crist de la Tramuntana (1968), and Dalí Seen from the Back Painting Gala from the Back Eternalised by Six Virtual Corneas Provisionally Reflected by Six Real Mirrors (1972-73).

There is also a set of works created by the artist expressly for the Museum, including the Mae West room, the Palace of the Wind room, the Monument to Francesc Pujols, and the Cadillac plujós.

A collection of holographic art by Dalí, and a collection of jewellery he designed are on display. Another room contains a bathtub and a side table with an open drawer and a lamp, all of which Dalí had installed upside-down on the ceiling.

An extension to the museum building contains a room dedicated to optical illusions, stereographs, and anamorphic art created by Dalí. The artist's final works, including his last oil painting, The Swallow's Tail (1983), are on display here.

== Gallery ==
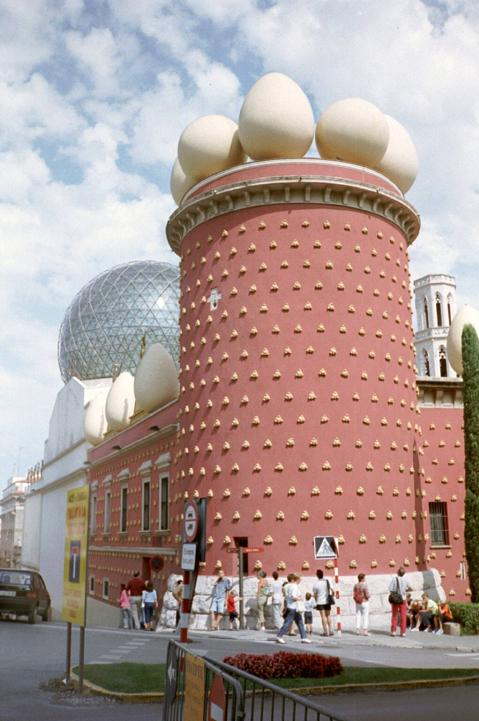
Museum entrance

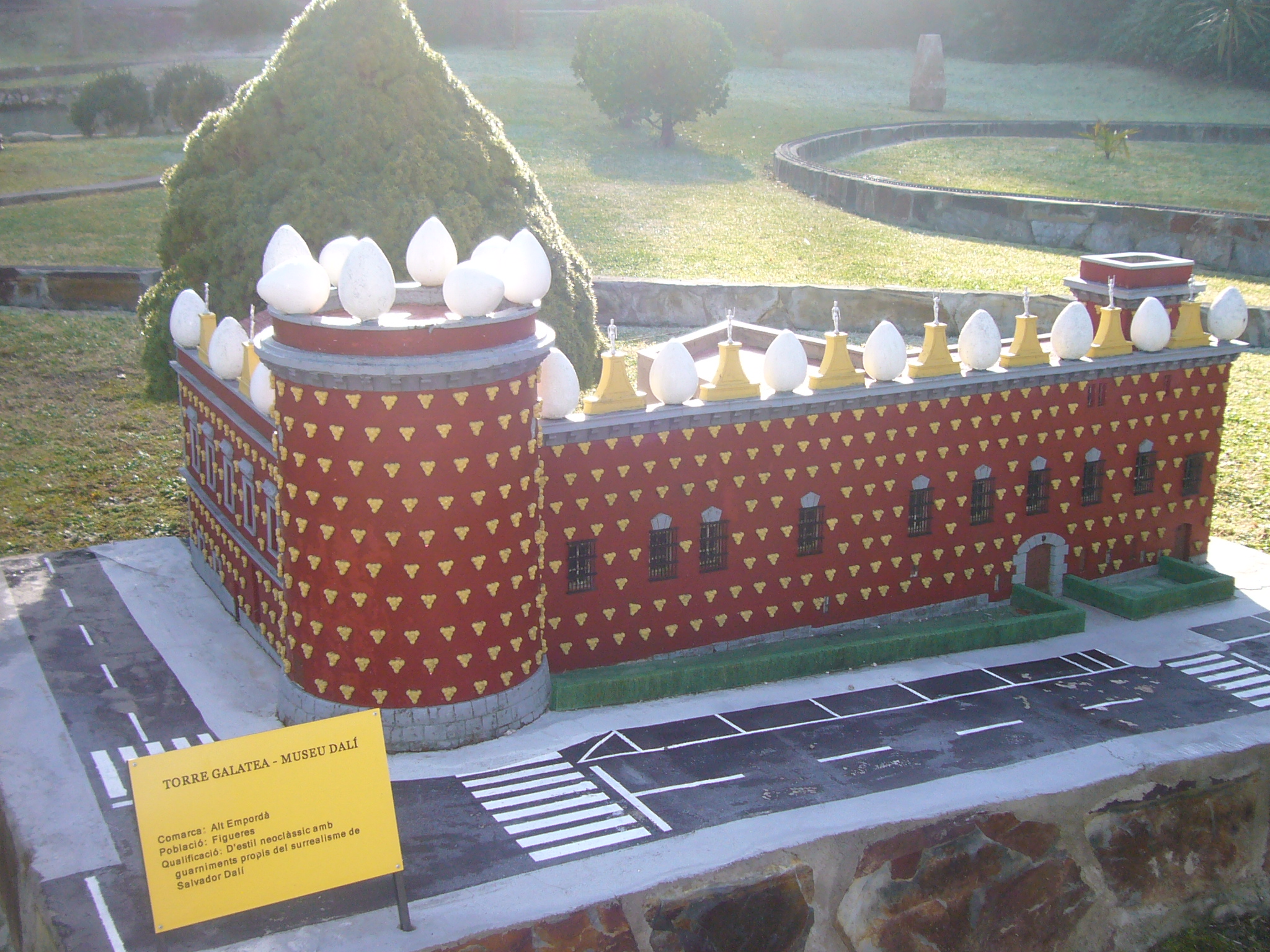
Scale model, at Catalunya en Miniatura

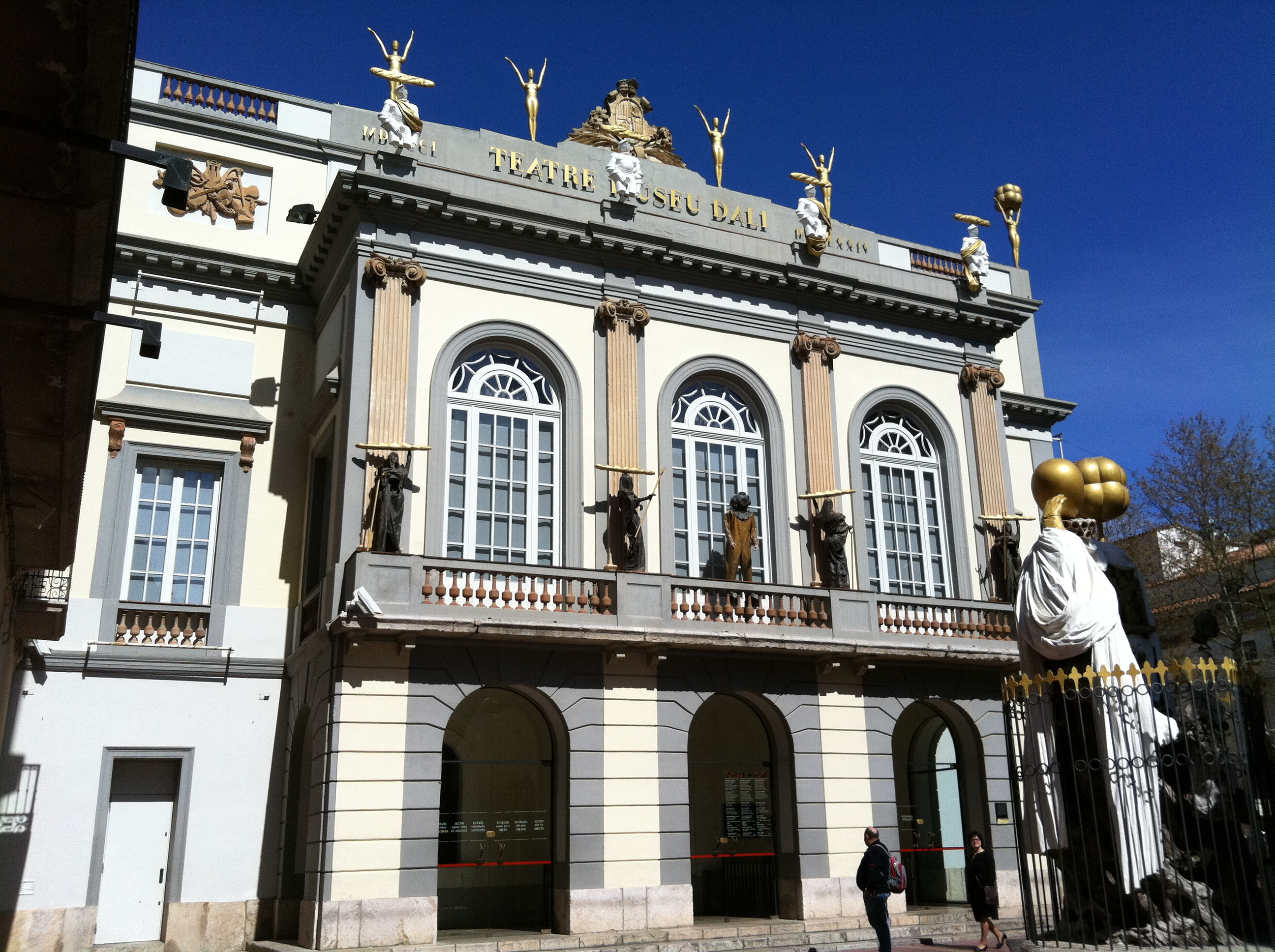
Fantastic figures adorn the south façade

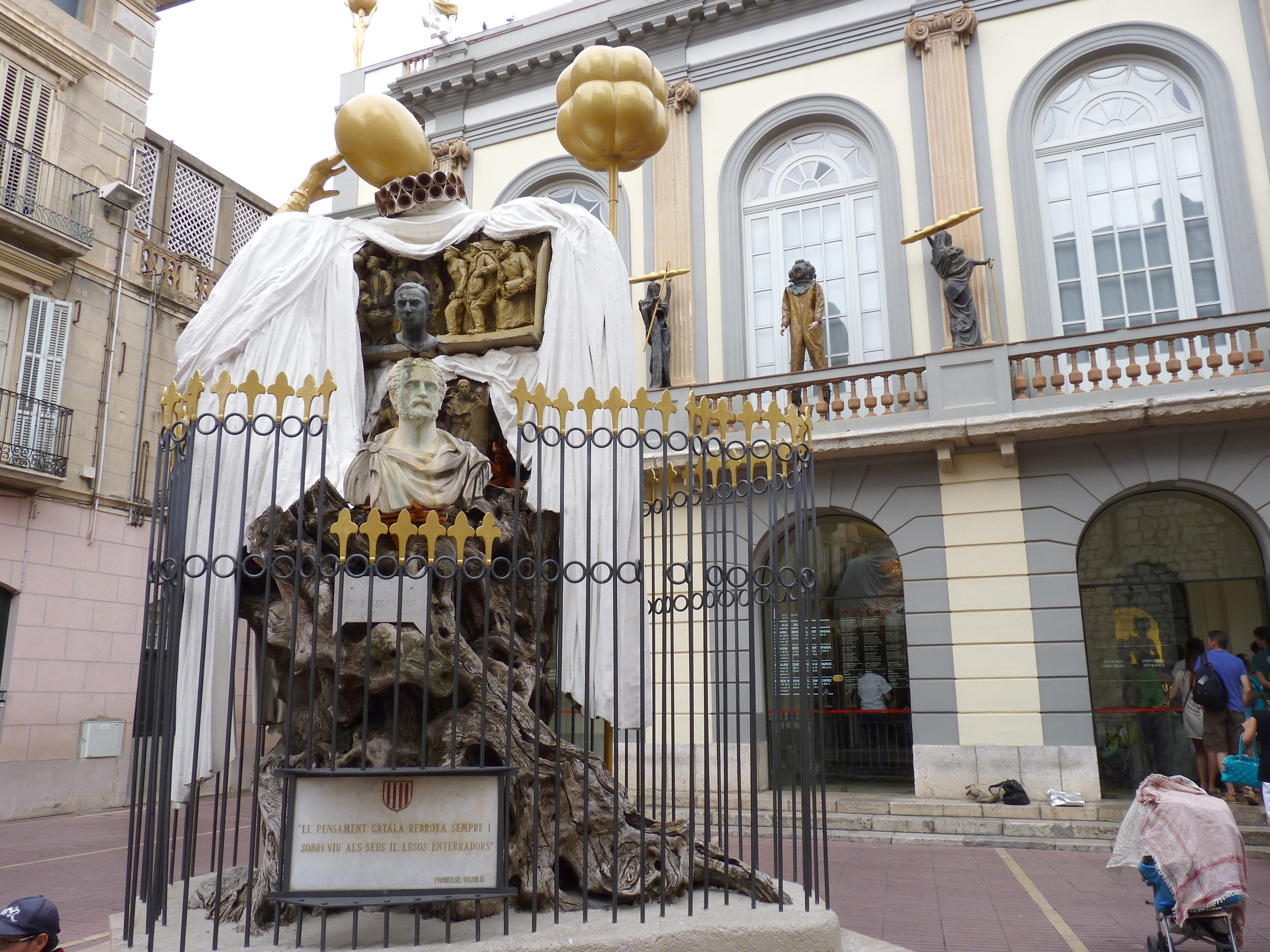
Sculpture next to entrance

Courtyard, with Cadillac installation at lower right

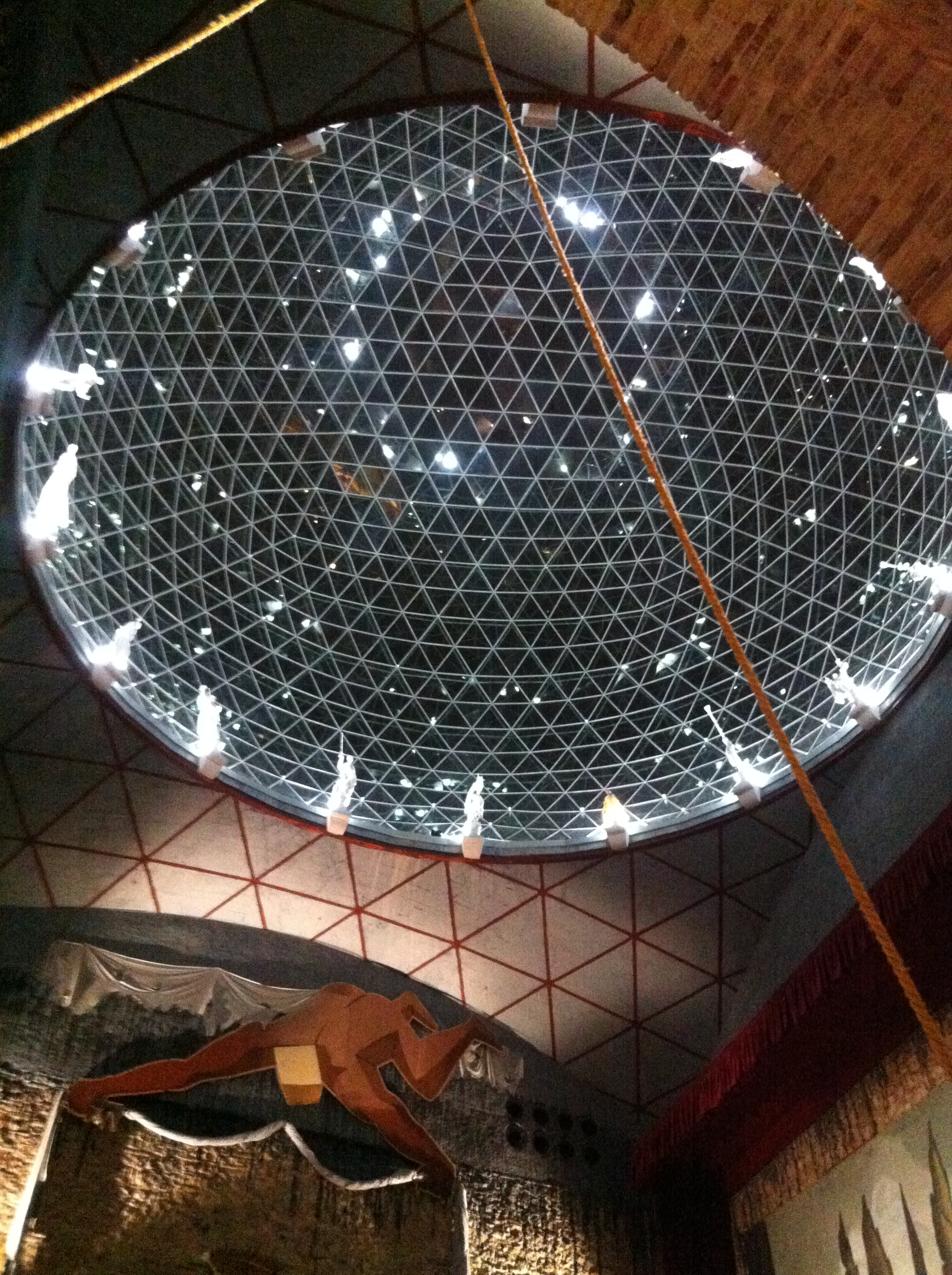
Inside view of the cupola

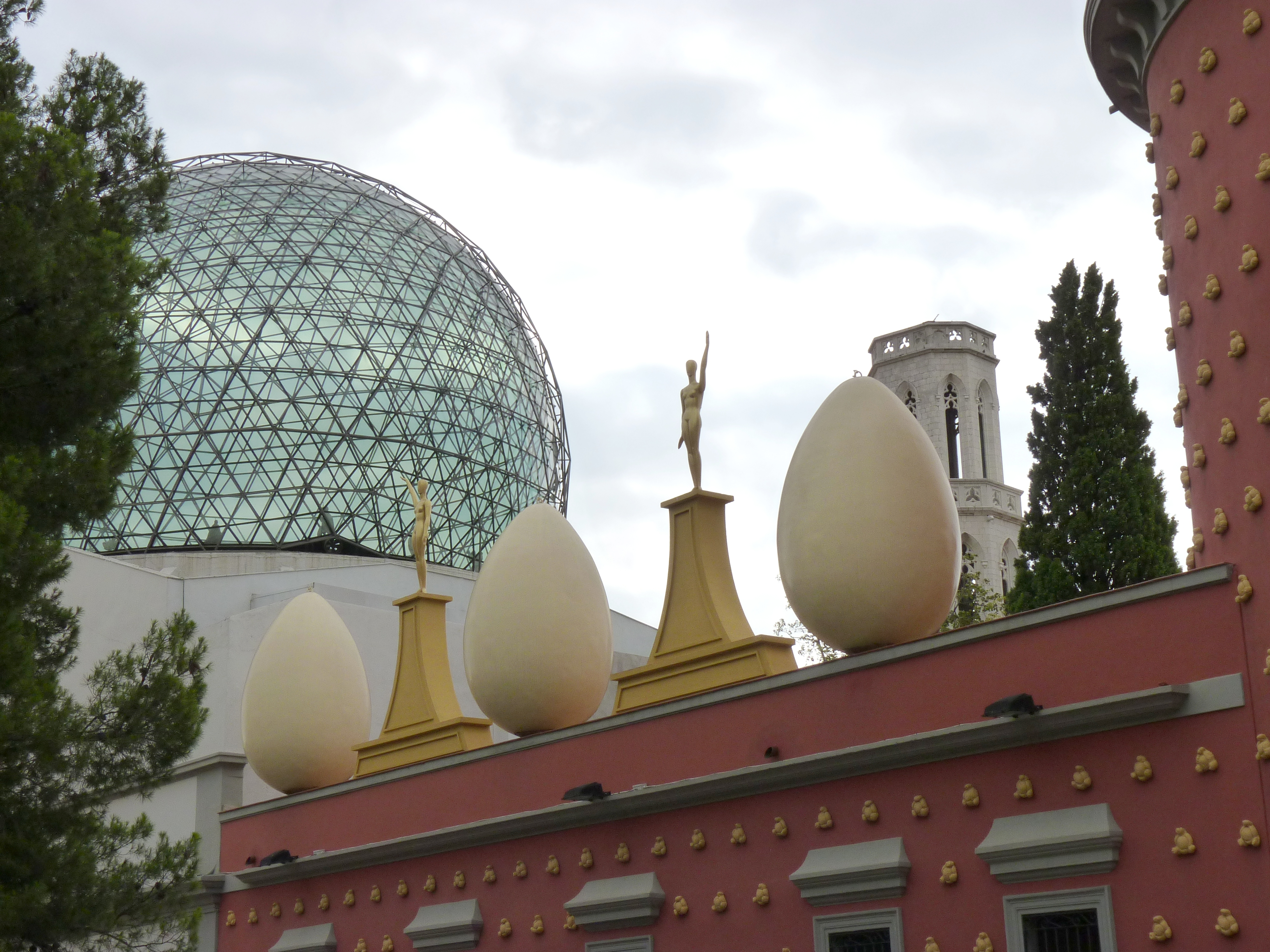
Roof parapet with giant eggs

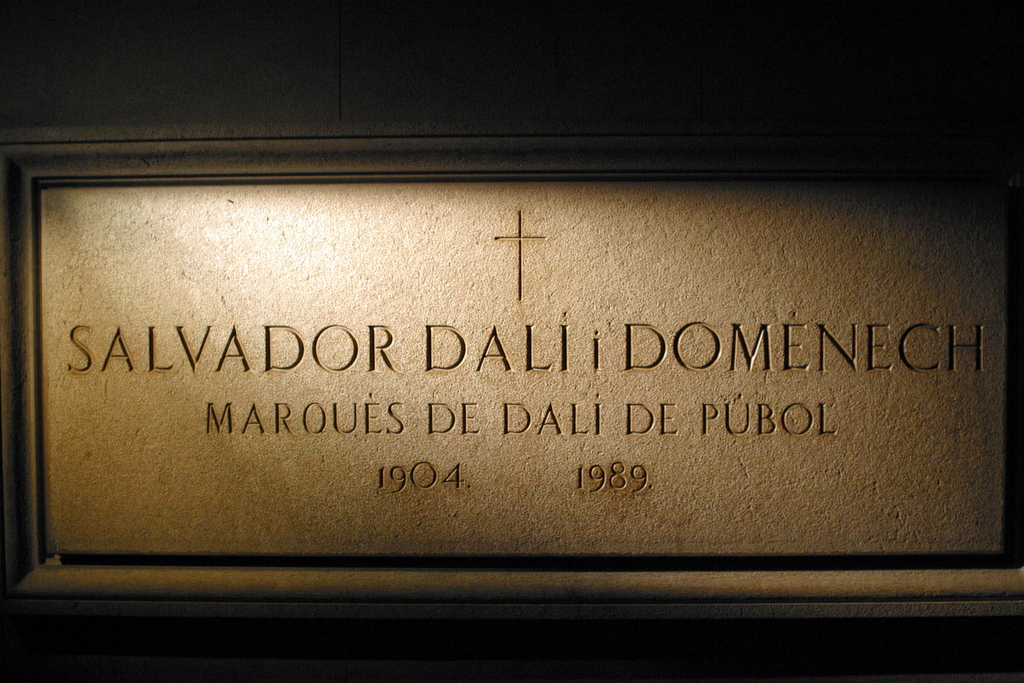
Dalí's crypt

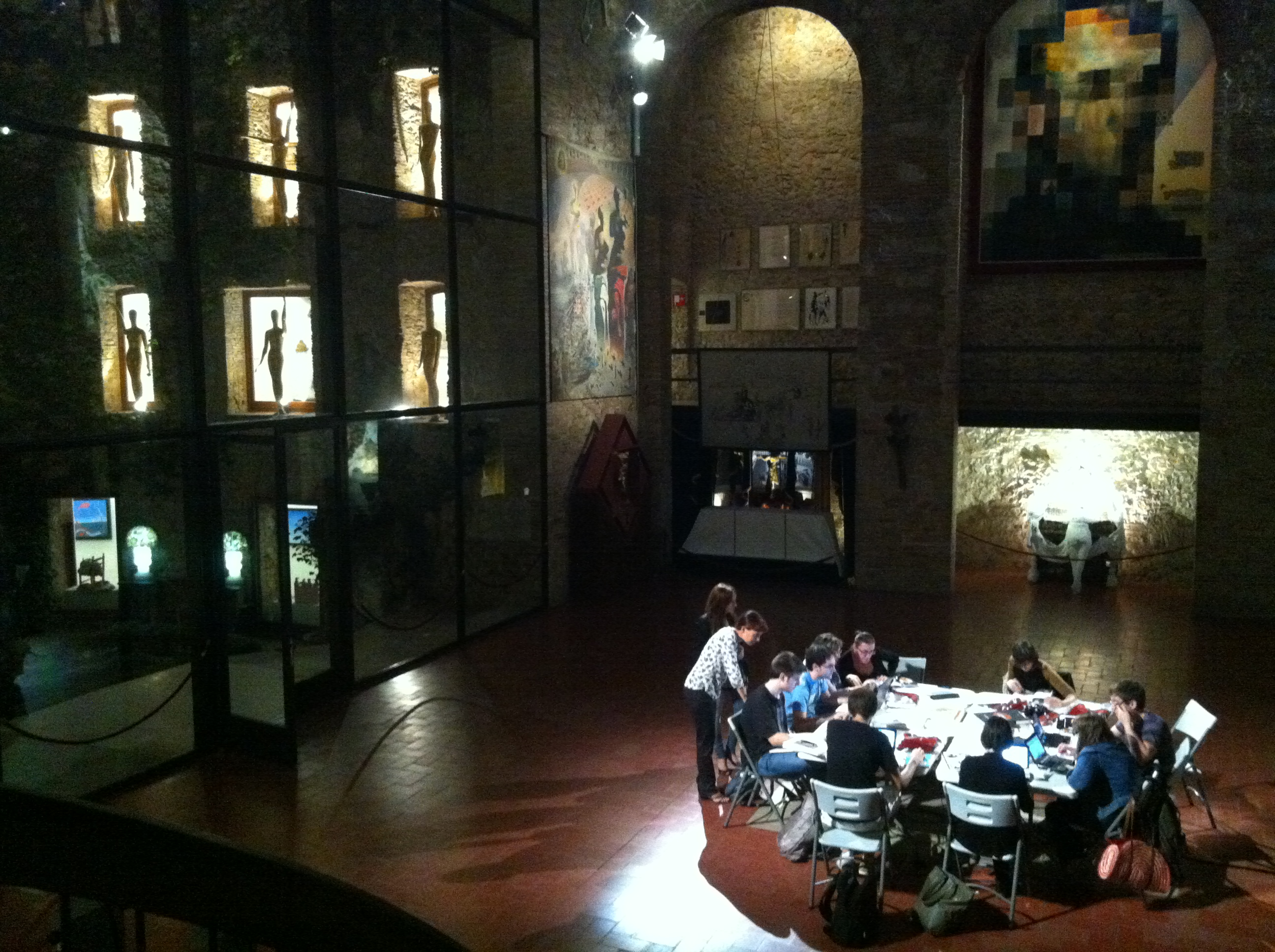
Wikipedia Edit-a-thon in the interior stage space (2012)

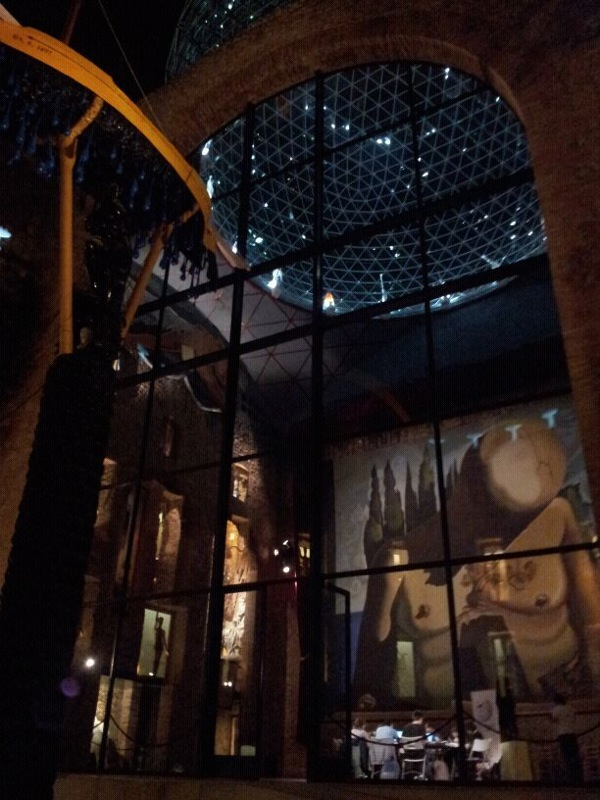
View of stage during the Edit-a-thon (2012)

== See also ==
- Castle of Púbol (Gala Dali Castle Museum-House) – in Púbol, Spain
- Dalí Paris – in Paris
- Salvador Dalí Museum – in St. Petersburg, Florida
- Dalí - Die Ausstellung am Potsdamer Platz - in Berlin, Germany
- Catalan art
- List of single-artist museums
