= Portlligat =

Village in Catalonia, Spain

Coordinates: 42°17′37.51″N 3°17′7.22″E

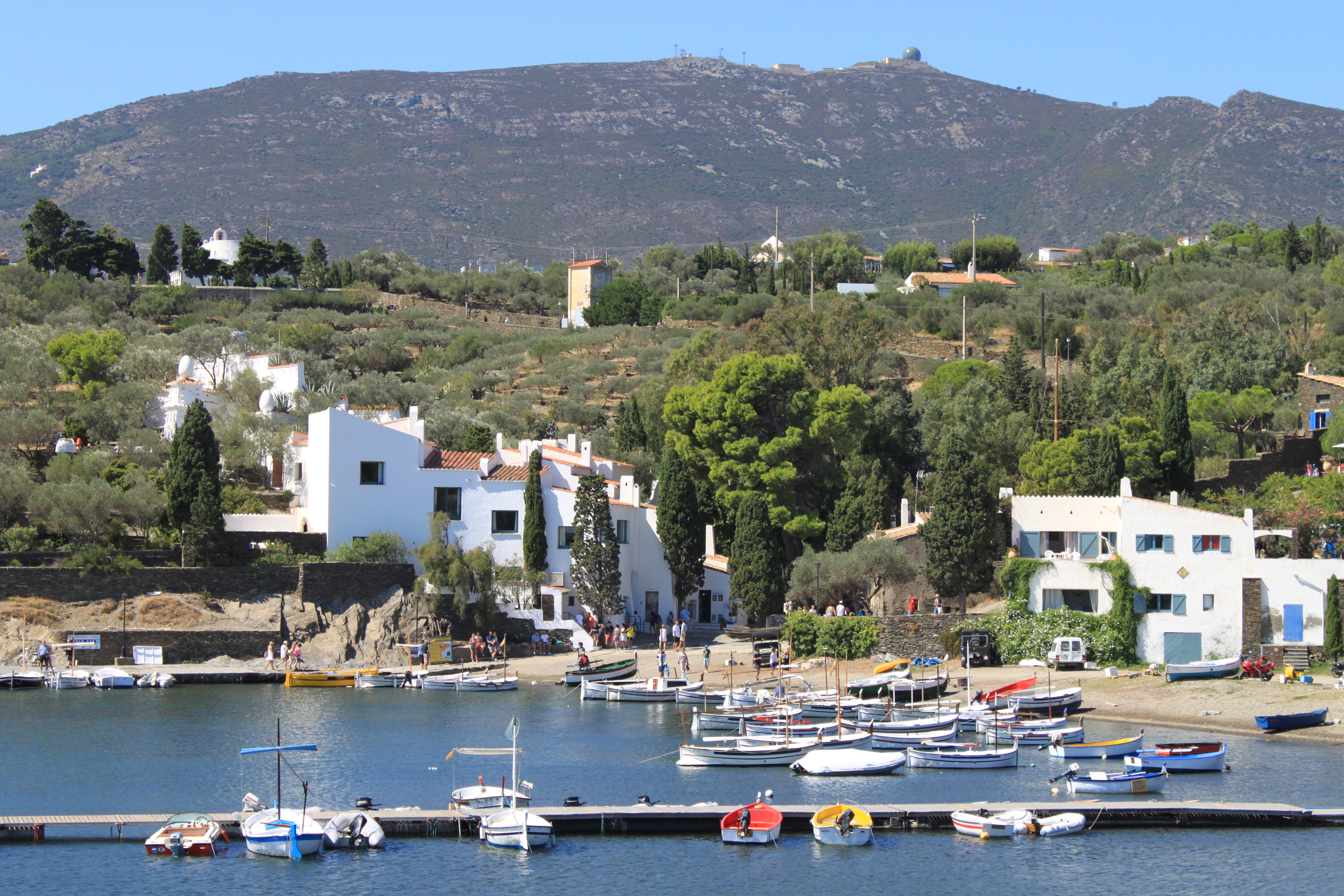
View of Portlligat

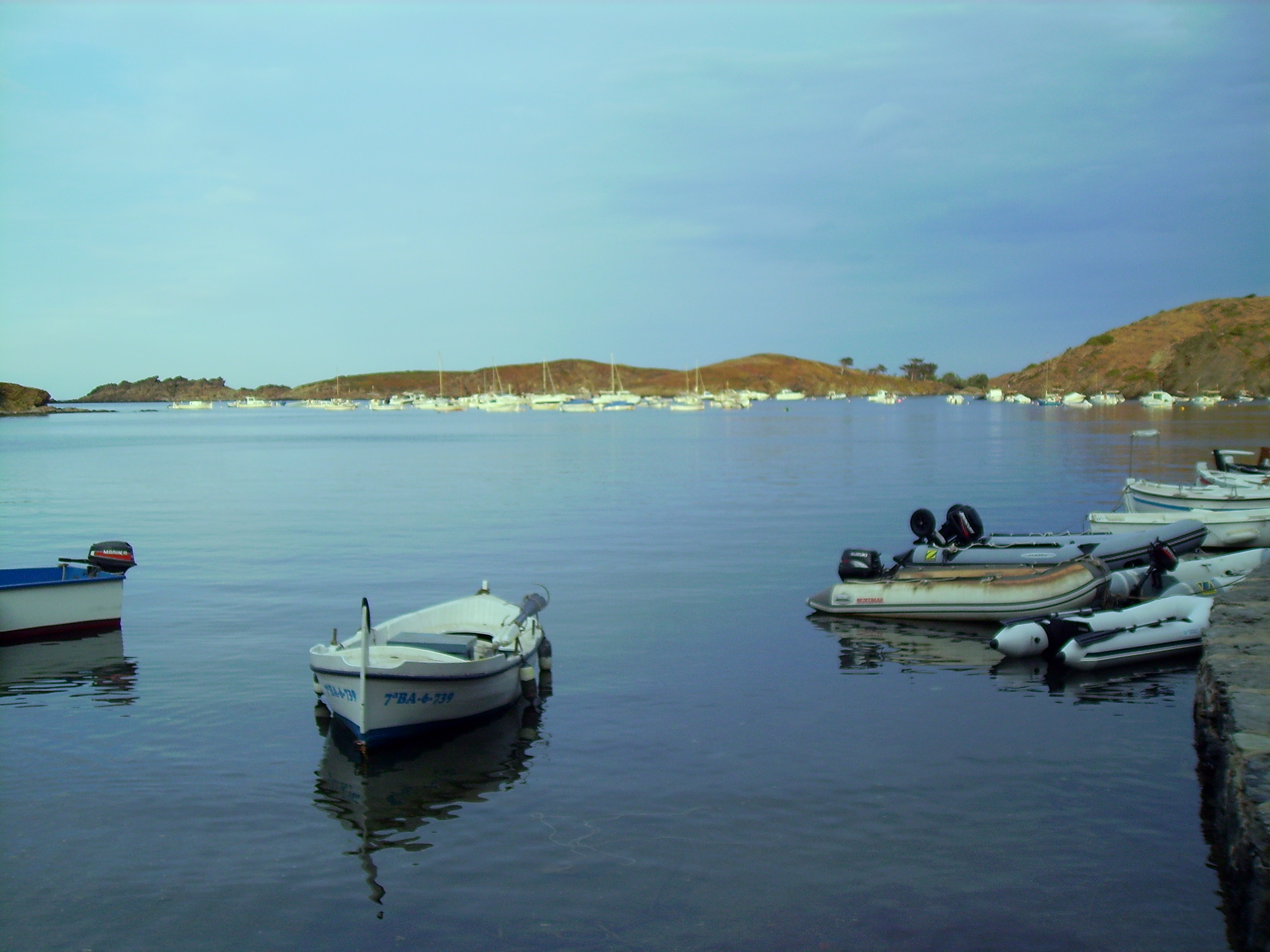
View of the bay

Portlligat is a small village located in a small bay on Cap de Creus peninsula, on the Costa Brava of the Mediterranean Sea, in the municipality of Cadaqués in the Alt Empordà comarca, in Catalonia, Spain. The island of Portlligat is located at the entrance of the bay, separated from the mainland by a narrow 30-metre-wide canal.

It gathered world attention after surrealist painter Salvador Dalí moved to live in the village. Now his house has been converted into the Salvador Dalí House Museum. Both the bay and the island have been represented in several of Dalí's paintings, such as The Madonna of Port Lligat, Crucifixion (Corpus Hypercubus), and The Sacrament of the Last Supper.
