= Delgadillo =

Delgadillo is a surname. Notable people with the surname include:

- Angel Delgadillo (born 1927), the creator of the first Route 66 Association
- Antonio Pérez Delgadillo (born 1978), Mexican football goalkeeper
- Ceyli Delgadillo, American voice actress
- Diego Delgadillo (born 1533), judge of the first Audiencia of New Spain
- Fernando Delgadillo (born 1965), Latin American musician and composer
- Jenaro Sánchez Delgadillo (1886–1927), Mexican martyr who died in the Cristero War
- Juan Delgadillo (disambiguation), the first owner of the historic eatery Delgadillo's Snow Cap Drive-In
- Nicolás Delgadillo (born 1997), Argentine footballer
- Robert A. Delgadillo (born 1971), also known as RAD, American artist whose work explores and celebrates pop culture
- Rocky Delgadillo (born 1960), the current City Attorney of Los Angeles, California
