= Bejeweled (song) =

2022 song by Taylor Swift

Promotional single by Taylor Swift

from the album Midnights
- Released: October 25, 2022
- Studio: Rough Customer (Brooklyn, New York); Electric Lady (New York)
- Genre: Synth-pop; bubblegum pop
- Length: 3:14
- Label: Republic
- Songwriters: Taylor Swift; Jack Antonoff
- Producers: Taylor Swift; Jack Antonoff

Music video
- "Bejeweled" on YouTube

"Bejeweled" is a song by the American singer-songwriter Taylor Swift from her tenth studio album, Midnights (2022). Written and produced by her and Jack Antonoff, it is an upbeat synth-pop and bubblegum pop track with elements of disco and electronica, backed by synthesizers. The lyrics are about Swift's narrator affirming her self-worth upon being unappreciated by her partner. Swift said that the song was also a metaphorical statement of her return to pop music with Midnights after the 2020 folk-oriented albums Folklore and Evermore.

"Bejeweled" was released for limited-time download via Swift's website on October 25, 2022. Music critics complimented the song's upbeat production and considered the lyrics empowering, although a few considered it a weaker track on Midnights and questioned its placement. The song peaked at number eight on the Billboard Global 200 and within the top 10 on charts in Australia, Canada, New Zealand, Singapore, the Philippines, and the United States. It received platinum or higher certifications in Australia, Brazil, Canada, New Zealand, and the United Kingdom.

Swift wrote and directed the music video for "Bejeweled". It stars Swift, Antonoff, Laura Dern, Haim, Dita Von Teese, and Pat McGrath. Influenced by "Cinderella", it features Swift as the protagonist reinventing herself and charming the prince, but she ultimately declines his marriage proposal. Swift included "Bejeweled" in the set list of her sixth headlining concert tour, the Eras Tour (2023–2024).

== Background and release ==
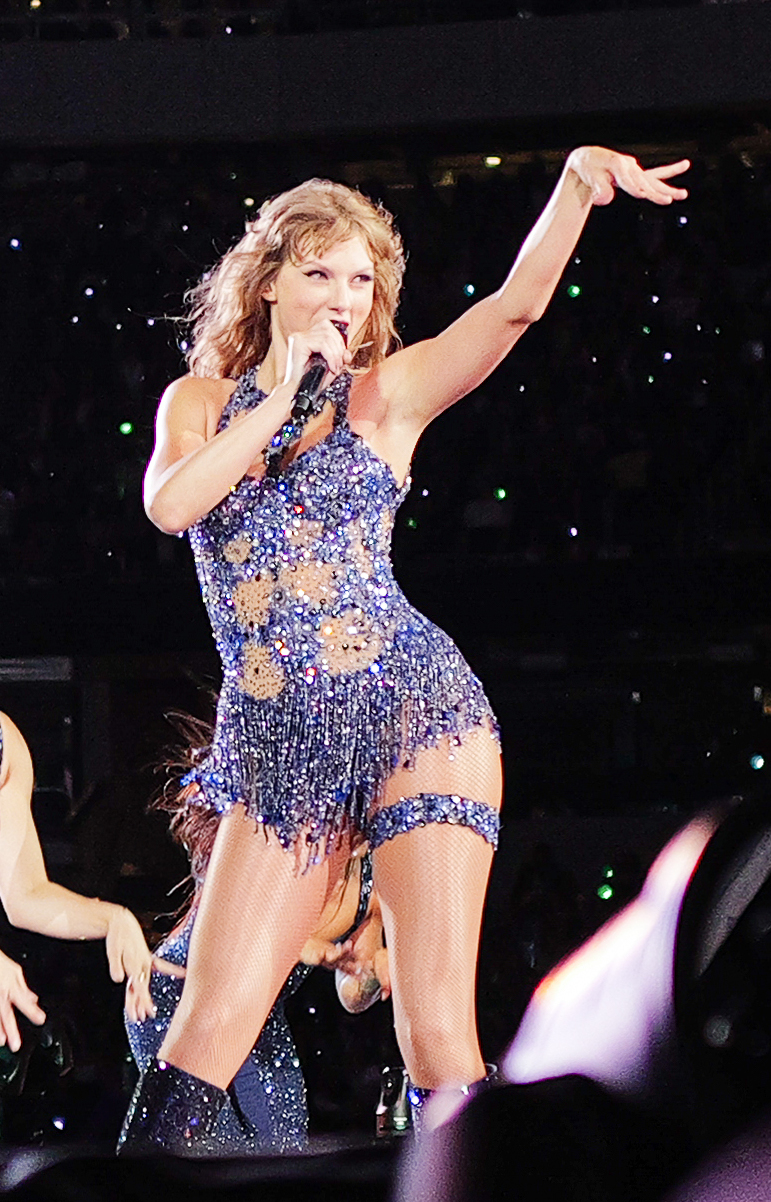
Swift performing "Bejeweled" on the Eras Tour in 2023

Taylor Swift announced her tenth original studio album, Midnights, at the 2022 MTV Video Music Awards on August 28; its title and cover artwork were released shortly after the same day via social media. She conceived Midnights as a collection of songs about her nocturnal ruminations, detailing a wide range of emotions such as regret, lust, nostalgia, contentment, and self-loathing. The standard album was produced by Swift and Antonoff, as a result of the two experimenting with music while their partners were both shooting for a film in Panama.

Swift announced the album's track listing via a thirteen-episode video series called Midnights Mayhem with Me on the platform TikTok, where each video contained the title of one track at a time. The title of "Bejeweled" was revealed in the episode posted on October 5, 2022. Republic Records released Midnights on October 21, 2022; its synth-based electropop production was a departure from the indie folk sounds of its immediate predecessors, Folklore and Evermore (2020). "Bejeweled" is track nine on the album; it was released for limited-time download via Swift's website on October 25, and an instrumental version followed two days later. Swift included "Bejeweled" in the set list of the Eras Tour (2023–2024).

On the Billboard Global 200 chart, "Bejeweled" debuted and peaked at number eight. It was one of the Midnights tracks that helped Swift become the first artist to claim nine spots in the top 10 the same week. In the United States, the song debuted and peaked at number six on the Billboard Hot 100; Swift became the first artist to monopolize the entire top 10 the same week thanks to the song and other Midnights tracks. It spent two consecutive weeks in the top 10 of the Billboard Hot 100. The song reached the top 10 on charts in the Philippines (4), Australia (7), Canada (7), Singapore (8), and New Zealand (9); and the top 20 in Vietnam (19) and South Africa (20). It was certified triple platinum in Australia; platinum in Brazil, Canada, New Zealand, and the United Kingdom; and gold in Mexico, Poland, and Spain.

== Music and lyrics ==
Swift wrote and produced "Bejeweled" with Antonoff, who recorded the song with David Hart, Evan Smith, and Laura Sisk at Rough Customer Studio, Brooklyn, and Electric Lady Studios, New York. Antonoff also programmed the track and played percussion, kalimba, acoustic guitars, bass, and a variety of synths including Juno 6, DX7, OB1, and Moog. Smith and Mikey Freedom Hart played additional synths and keyboards, and their performance was recorded by David Hart at Big Mercy Sound, Brooklyn. Serban Ghenea, assisted by Bryce Bordone, mixed "Bejeweled" at MixStar Studios, Virginia Beach, Virginia, and Randy Merrill mastered it at Sterling Sound, Edgewater, New Jersey.

Set at a tempo of 82 beats per minute, "Bejeweled" is an upbeat song. It incorporates synth-pop and bubblegum pop. The production consists of layered synth sequences, a deep Moog bass, and Juno 6 synth arpeggiators, creating musical hooks with a sound that critics described as "glimmering", "plinking", and "shimmery". Swift's vocals are multitracked and edited with automated reverb. Some critics aligned the sound of "Bejeweled" with diverse sources. Rolling Stone's Rob Sheffield said that the track has a "disco rush" and is "full of late-night disco jitters". According to Paste's Ellen Johnston, the synth stylings evoke electronica. The music critic Annie Zaleski likened the synth production to 1980s new wave, and Craig Jenkins of Vulture opined that the song has a maximalist quality similar to the music of Swift's 2019 album Lover. There were comparisons to the music of other artists, such as LCD Soundsystem and Giorgio Moroder.

The lyrics are about recognizing self-worth and regaining confidence after a heartbreak. Swift's narrator addresses how her partner takes her for granted when she was "graded on a curve" despite her efforts to maintain the relationship. She tells the partner that she can still "make the whole world shimmer". As she asserts her autonomy and power ("I'm going out tonight"; "I polish up real nice"), she also reflects on her sadness and grief ("Sapphire tears on my face/ Sadness became my whole sky"). Billboard's Jason Lipshutz thought that the track showcased the complexes of Swift's personality, and Sheffield considered the narrative of "Bejeweled" a continuation of Swift's "Tolerate It" (2020), showing "the wife [...] finally breaking free". Swift stated the song also was a statement for her return to pop music on Midnights: that she was still "bejeweled" enough for pop after "writing folk songs and being in this metaphorical forest that [she'd] created".

Several interpretations thought that "Bejeweled" was relatable to women. PopMatters's Rick Quinn likened the theme of asserting a woman's autonomy to that of Lesley Gore's "You Don't Own Me" (1963), and Zaleski summed up the song's mantra as "Fake it 'til you make it" as the narrator stands up for themselves in a relationship and regains confidence. Catherine Robb and Kate Schmidt, academics in philosophy, wrote about how Swift examines the societal perceptions of and discriminations against women from the perspective of a "good girl" and how she can rebuff those remarks, which resulted in an ideal scenario for women at large. According to Alba and Amandas Cercas Curry, also academics in philosophy, "Bejeweled" expresses anger against being undervalued in a personal relationship, but this theme is also applicable to larger themes such as unequal relationships in professional or societal settings, which represents "female rage".

== Critical reception ==
Several critics complimented the production of "Bejeweled". Brittany Spanos of Rolling Stone dubbed it an "absolute knockout", and Mark Sutherland of Rolling Stone UK hailed it as Swift's "swaggiest showstopper" since "The Man" (2020). Under the Radar's Andy Von Pip considered "Bejeweled" a catchy song with an earworm that showcased Swift's melodic songwriting, Carl Wilson of Slate appreciated the song's lively synths and the lyrics about "living well". Saloni Gajjar of The A.V. Club described it as an unapologetic, "feel-good melody meant to be played loudly".

Sheffield said the song is an "anxious dance-floor poseur of 'Mirrorball' grown up", featuring both Swift's confidence and vulnerability. Jason Lipshutz said "Bejeweled" conveys Swift's years of experience as a songwriter. Lipshutz added that song is "a story of refusing to settle into early-thirties ennui". Helen Brown of The Independent wrote, Swift "warns a guy that she has the capacity to light up rooms (and all the boys in the band) if he doesn't pay more attention". Elise Ryan from the Associated Press was less enthusiastic and deemed "Bejeweled" a weaker track on Midnights for being "a bit too candy sweet". The New York Times' Jon Caramanica panned the lyrics as underwhelming and the production as "metallic and tense".

== Music video ==
=== Release and production ===
On October 16, 2022, Swift posted onto her social media an itinerary detailing the promotion for the album, titled Midnights Manifest. It showed that in addition to the music video for the lead single "Anti-Hero", a music video for "another track" was scheduled for release on October 25. One day before the release, Swift disclosed that the music video was for "Bejeweled". Excerpts from the video were shown in a teaser trailer for the album's visuals during Amazon Prime Video's broadcast of Thursday Night Football on October 20. Besides Swift, the cast of the "Bejeweled" music video—Antonoff, the actress Laura Dern, the female pop-rock band Haim (Este, Danielle, and Alana), the burlesque dancer Dita Von Teese, and the makeup artist Pat McGrath—also appeared in the trailer. Written and directed by Swift, the music video for "Bejeweled" premiered on her Vevo channel via YouTube.

Swift's team reached out to Dita Von Teese for her appearance. They talked about Von Teese's influence on performances. Joseph Cassell, a stylist of Swift, studied Von Teese's collection and subsequently made recreations of Catherine D'lish original costumes for the video. Von Teese filmed her scenes in August 2022, and the giant martini glasses used came from her personal performance collection. Swift and her team collaborated with make-up artist McGrath, who also had a cameo as the Queen character, to design the looks for the video.

=== Synopsis ===
Media publications pointed out many Easter eggs possibly referencing songs and memorabilia from her 2010 album, Speak Now. Swift portrays a Cinderella-like character, named "House Wench Taylor". Taylor endures mockery from her wicked stepmother (Dern), and the evil stepsisters (Haim), one of whose vomit Taylor is forced to clean up. The stepmother and the stepsisters eagerly plan to compete in the ball, where the winner of the talent competition is to receive her own castle and a proposal from "Prince Jack" (Antonoff); whilst reminding Taylor that she is in exile and not allowed to attend. As they leave for the ball, Taylor opens a fob watch signifying the end of her exile and wears her cloak as she enters a golden elevator on her way to the ball in a skyscraper. The elevator contains an Easter egg wherein the color of each elevator button represents every album Swift has released as of the music video's release, with the thirteenth and last button, which is purple, representing the then-forthcoming Speak Now (Taylor's Version) (2023).

On the third floor, Taylor walks into an environment filled with falling gemstones before taking her cloak off, revealing a black American burlesque-inspired dance outfit. The gems fall into place on her bodysuit and boots, and a bracelet and necklace attach around her wrist and neck. Exiting the elevator on the fifth floor, Taylor meets her "fairy goddess" (Von Teese), both wearing silver burlesque-style outfits. After peeling off their stockings, they perform a dance number in a pair of giant martini glasses.

Finally, Taylor reaches the thirteenth floor and takes the stage at the ball in a clockwork-inspired setting surrounded by showgirls, wearing a black jewelled two-piece outfit and silver heels. Her act stuns the wicked stepmother and stepsisters, and impresses "Queen Pat" (McGrath), who forces Jack to propose to Taylor. Taylor rejects Jack's marriage proposal and ghosts him, though he shrugs it off and accepts her decision. The music video ends with Taylor enjoying the view from her newly-acquired castle as three dragons fly around it. The music video features orchestral versions of two Speak Now songs: "Enchanted" in the beginning and "Long Live" at the end.

== Accolades ==
Awards and nominations for "Bejeweled"
Organization	Year	Category	Result	Ref.
ADG Excellence in Production Design Awards	2023	Short Format: Music Video or Web Series	Nominated	
Make-Up Artists and Hair Stylists Guild Awards	2023	Best Hair Styling in Commercials or Music Videos	Nominated	
iHeartRadio Music Awards	2023	TikTok Bop of the Year	Won	
Nickelodeon Kids' Choice Awards	2023	Favorite Song	Nominated	
BMI Pop Awards	2024	Most Performed Songs of the Year	Won	

== Personnel ==
Credits are adapted from the liner notes of Midnights.

- Taylor Swift – vocals, songwriter, producer
- Jack Antonoff – songwriter, producer, programming, percussion, Juno 6, DX7, OB1, kalimba, Moog, acoustic guitars, bass, background vocals, recording
- Evan Smith – synths, recording
- Mikey Freedom Hart – keys
- Megan Searl – assistant engineer
- John Sher – assistant engineer
- John Rooney – assistant engineer
- Serban Ghenea – mix engineer
- Bryce Bordone – assistant mix engineer
- Randy Merrill – mastering engineer
- Laura Sisk – recording
- David Hart – recording

== Charts ==
Chart performance for "Bejeweled"
Chart (2022–2023)	Peak position
Australia (ARIA)	7
Belgium (Billboard)	25
Canada Hot 100 (Billboard)	7
Croatia (Billboard)	21
Czech Republic Singles Digital (ČNS IFPI)	38
France (SNEP)	145
Global 200 (Billboard)	8
Greece International (IFPI)	16
Iceland (Tónlistinn)	29
Ireland (Billboard)	9
Lithuania (AGATA)	38
Malaysia (Billboard)	15
Malaysia International (RIM)	11
Netherlands (Single Tip)	1
New Zealand (Recorded Music NZ)	9
Philippines (Billboard)	4
Portugal (AFP)	22
Singapore (RIAS)	8
Slovakia (Singles Digitál Top 100)	43
South Africa (RISA)	20
Spain (Promusicae)	65
Sweden (Sverigetopplistan)	44
UK Singles (Official Charts)	63
US Billboard Hot 100	6
Vietnam Hot 100 (Billboard)	19

== Certifications ==
Certifications for "Bejeweled"
Region	Certification	Certified units/sales
Australia (ARIA)	3× Platinum	210,000^{‡}
Brazil (Pro-Música Brasil)	Platinum	40,000^{‡}
Canada (Music Canada)	Platinum	80,000^{‡}
Mexico (AMPROFON)	Gold	70,000^{‡}
New Zealand (RMNZ)	Platinum	30,000^{‡}
Poland (ZPAV)	Gold	25,000^{‡}
Spain (Promusicae)	Gold	30,000^{‡}
United Kingdom (BPI)	Platinum	600,000^{‡}
^{‡} Sales+streaming figures based on certification alone.

== Release history ==
Release dates and formats for "Bejeweled"
Region	Date	Format	Version	Ref.
United States	October 25, 2022	Digital download	Original	
United States	October 27, 2022	Digital download	Instrumental	
