= Louis-Marie de Castelbajac =

French designer and entrepreneur (born 1983)

- Born: 6 July 1983 (age 42); Paris, France
- Occupations: Artist, designer, actor
- Parents: Jean-Charles de Castelbajac (father); Catherine de Castelbajac (mother)

Louis-Marie de Castelbajac (born 6 July 1983) is a French designer and entrepreneur.

== Early life ==
Louis-Marie de Castelbajac was born in Paris, France, the son of fashion designer Jean-Charles de Castelbajac and Catherine de Castelbajac. He is a Count from one of the oldest families of France, originating from Castelbajac in the region of Bigorre.

== Career ==
De Castelbajac has two fashion lines. He is also an actor, an artist, and owner of an Armagnac brand.

=== Fashion ===
De Castelbajac worked for several years in the menswear unit of his father's fashion label, and served as creative director of his Castelbajac Lignée collection. In 2007, he launched a line of fitted cotton t-shirts called Panda Kunst. The shirts tend to have politically based slogans.

Later, he created another fashion label called Le Void, which refers to The Book of Five Rings by samurai Miyamoto Musashi. The label consists of knit wear and t-shirts with plays on words written on them.

He also collaborates with Tyler Alexandra Ellis to produce a bag line for her label, Tyler Alexandra. The line includes a bag with a beret top produced in France's oldest beret factory.

De Castelbajac has also created t-shirts for OVS as part of an AIDS awareness campaign.

=== Acting ===
De Castelbajac has appeared in plays, movies, and art films. He lived in Los Angeles, California from age 19 to 25. While he was there, he attended university and acted in two television pilots of Him and Us, directed by Charles Shyer. He was in a Nespresso commercial with George Clooney, and was in a 2005 remake of Caligula. He has appeared in art films by Marianne Maric and Mike Kelley. In 2014, he acted in a film called The Permission, filming in Afghanistan and Scotland, and appeared in adidas commercials for the re-release of their Stan Smith style.

=== Armagnac ===
Armagnac is an emblematic product of de Castelbajac's region of France. He created his Armagnac 700 in 2013, after researching and working with an oenologist for several years. He designed the bottle himself, wrapping it in a felt ring made by the last beret producer in that region of France. He produced a special collection for Colette, and the drink is also sold at Le Bon Marché, Harry's New York Bar, Hôtel Meurice, and Chateau Marmont.

=== Art ===
De Castelbajac has shown artwork in two solo exhibits. The first was an exhibit in Paris, France called The Anatomy of 1, a collection of drawings, collages, photos, and installations inspired by media violence. His second exhibition was called The Blood, the Bow & Arrows of Desire.

In 2010, he helped create a Bûche de Noel for Pierre Hermé.

== Personal life ==
Louis-Marie de Castelbajac shares the Château de Loubersan with his father in a hamlet in the region. He grew up in Paris and the United Kingdom, and was educated at Oundle School and the Ecole Active Bilingue in Paris 15 and in the United States.
