= Dita Von Teese =

American vedette, burlesque dancer, model, and businesswoman

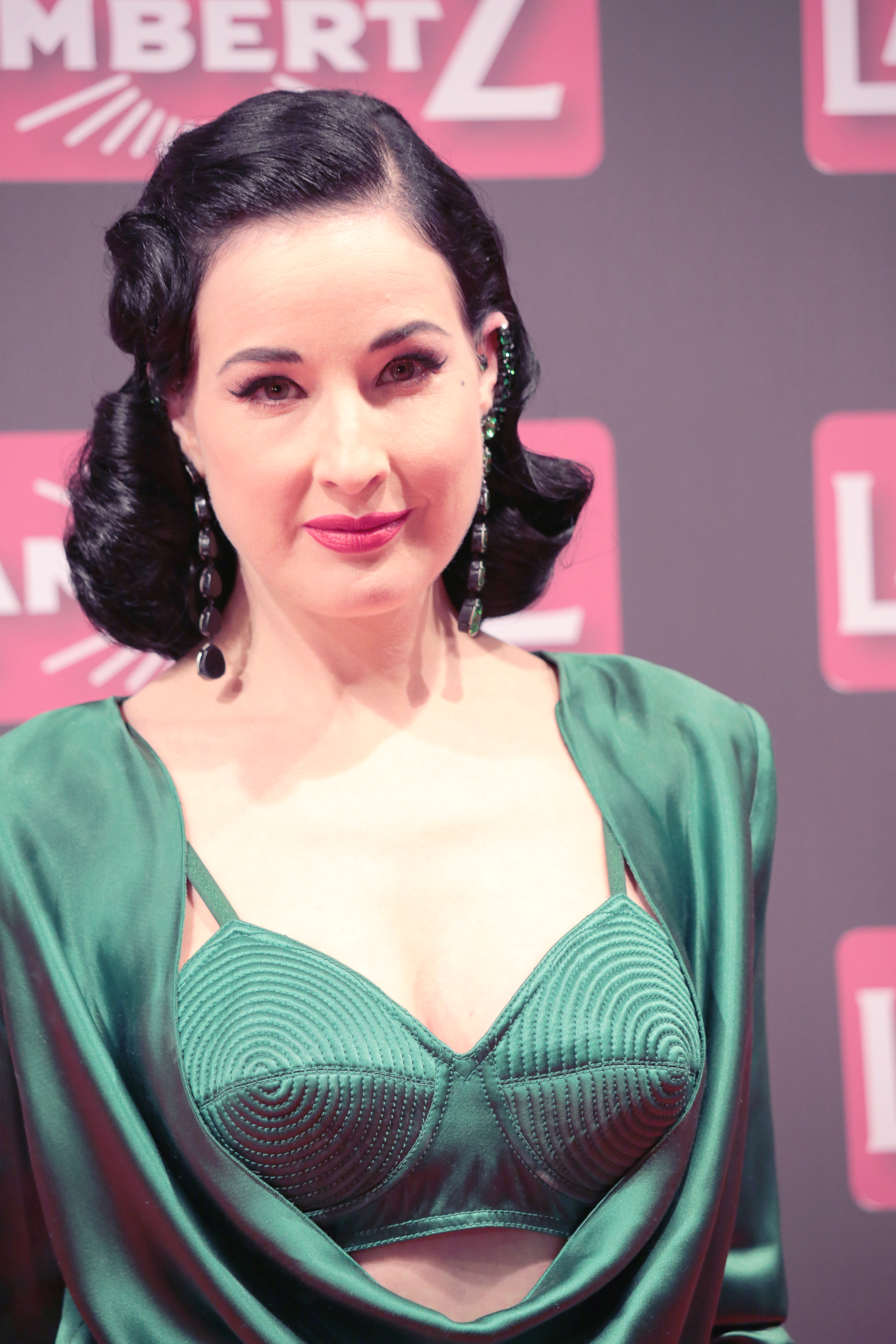
- Von Teese in 2018
- Born: Heather Renée Sweet; September 28, 1972 (age 54); Rochester, Michigan, U.S.
- Occupations: Burlesque dancer; vedette; model; businesswoman; actress; author
- Years active: 1990–present
- Spouse: Marilyn Manson (m. 2005; div. 2007)
- Partner: Adam Rajcevich (2014–present)
- Website: dita.net

Heather Renée Sweet (born September 28, 1972), known professionally as Dita Von Teese, is an American vedette, burlesque dancer, model, actress, and businesswoman. She is credited with re-popularizing burlesque performance, earning the moniker "Queen of Burlesque".

Von Teese has appeared in CSI: Crime Scene Investigation, RuPaul's Drag Race, The Masked Dancer, The Curious Creations of Christine McConnell, among other television productions. She is also known for her short marriage to singer Marilyn Manson as well as performing in his music videos. Von Teese has released two books on burlesque history, fetishism and beauty. She has toured the world with her burlesque shows in cities like London, Berlin, New York and Paris. Among her special guests on the tours are Dirty Martini, Perle Noire, Ginger Valentine, Jett Adore and Playboy model Gia Genevieve. Von Teese has been a special guest at the Parisian venue Crazy Horse several times. From 2007 to 2013, she was a global ambassador for Cointreau and in 2010–2011 she was the face of Perrier. She has also created four perfumes under the brand Dita Von Teese Perfumes. She also has her own brand of lingerie, as well as stockings under the name Secrets in Lace and luxurious cardigans for Australian online store Wheels & Dollbaby.

== Early life ==
Von Teese was born Heather Renée Sweet in Rochester, Michigan, the second of three daughters. When she was five, her family moved to West Branch, Michigan. Describing her hometown, she says, "It's a universe away from the colored Klieg lights of Hollywood and Paris. But on weekend afternoons, my mom and I had a front seat on a rocket ship to those faraway worlds by way of the old movies starring the most glamorous creatures – Betty Grable, Mae West, Carmen Miranda, Marlene Dietrich... They were our muses." Her father was a machinist and her mother a manicurist. She is of English, Scottish, Armenian, and German heritage. Von Teese has stated that one of her grandmothers was half-Armenian and was adopted. Von Teese is known for her fascination with 1940s cinema and classic vintage style. This began at a young age and was fostered by her mother, who would buy clothes for her daughter to dress up. Her mother was a fan of old, Golden Age-era Hollywood films, and from her, Von Teese developed a fascination with the actresses of that day, especially Betty Grable.

She was classically trained as a ballet dancer from an early age, and danced solo at age 13 for a local ballet company. Though she originally wanted to be a ballerina, Von Teese states that "by 15, I was as good as I'd ever be." She was later to incorporate this element into her burlesque shows, where she frequently goes en pointe. The family relocated from Michigan to Orange County, California, when her father's job moved. Von Teese attended University High School in Irvine, California.

When Von Teese was a teenager, her mother took her to buy her first bra, made from plain white cotton, and gave her a plastic egg containing a pair of wrinkly, flesh-colored pantyhose. Von Teese says she was disappointed, as she had been hoping to receive beautiful lacy garments and stockings, of the type she had glimpsed in her father's Playboy magazines. This fueled her passion for lingerie. She worked in a lingerie store as a salesgirl when she was 15, eventually as a buyer. Von Teese has been fond of wearing elaborate lingerie such as corsets and basques with fully fashioned stockings ever since. In college, Von Teese studied historic costuming and aspired to work as a stylist for films. She is a trained costume designer, often designing her photo shoots herself.

At 18, Von Teese had her famous beauty mark tattooed on her left cheek. She originally intended to have a star tattooed but the tattoo parlor refused. In her first book, she states that she visited a strip club for the first time at age 19 and was soon hired alongside her job at a beauty counter. She was stunned by the other strippers' lack of originality and wanted to incorporate vintage and fetish style into her performance.

== Career ==
Von Teese chose her stage name by adopting the name Dita as a tribute to silent film actress Dita Parlo. For her breakthrough December 2002 Playboy cover, she was required to have a surname, so she chose Von Treese from the phonebook. Playboy misspelled it Von Teese, a name which she then kept. Von Teese is known for her signature painted eyes, heavily penciled brows, swipe of crimson lipstick, and blue-black locks. She says, "I have my signature look and I'm sticking to it, because it's the look that is one hundred percent me, and one hundred percent created by me. I might be a one-trick for it. But it's a pretty good trick!"

=== Fetish and glamour modeling ===
Von Teese achieved some level of recognition in the fetish world as a tightlacer. Through the wearing of a corset for many years, she had reduced her waistline to 22 inches (56 cm), and can be laced down as far as 16.5 inches (42 cm).

Von Teese appeared on numerous fetish magazine covers, including Bizarre and Marquis. It was around this time when she appeared on the cover of Midori's book, The Seductive Art of Japanese Bondage. Von Teese was featured in Playboy in 1999, 2001, and 2002, with a cover-featured pictorial in 2002. German metal band Atrocity chose her as the cover model for their 2008 album, Werk 80 II.

She has stated in print, "I love fetish for its powers of transformation and also for its beauty." Among her heroes of vintage fetish history are John Willie, Bettie Page, and Irving Klaw.

=== Burlesque ===
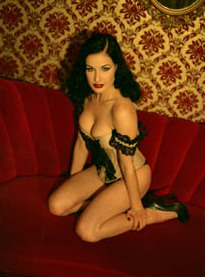
Von Teese is a prominent Neo-Burlesque performer.

Von Teese is best known for her burlesque routines and is frequently dubbed the "Queen of Burlesque" in the press. Von Teese began performing burlesque in 1992, and, as a proponent of Neo-Burlesque, has helped to popularize its revival. In her own words, she "puts the tease back into striptease" with long, elaborate dance shows with props and characters, often inspired by 1930s and 1940s musicals and films. Some of her more famous dances have involved a carousel horse, a giant powder compact, a filigree heart and a clawfoot bathtub with a working shower head. Her feather fan dance, inspired by burlesque dancer Sally Rand, featured the world's largest feather fans, now on display in Hollywood's Museum of Sex.

Von Teese's signature acts feature:

- The Martini Glass
- The Opium Den
- Le Bain Noir (re-invented for the 2009 Crazy Horse show)
- Bird of Paradise
- Lazy (based on Marilyn Monroe's performance in There's No Business Like Show Business)
- The Champagne Glass
- The Black Swan (based on the ballet by Pyotr Ilyich Tchaikovsky)

Her burlesque career has included some memorable performances. She once appeared at a benefit for the New York Academy of Art wearing nothing but $5 million worth of diamonds. Additionally, Von Teese became the first guest star at the Crazy Horse cabaret club in Paris with her appearance in October 2006. In 2006, Von Teese appeared on an episode of America's Next Top Model (cycle 7) doing a workshop to teach the contestants about sensuality by means of burlesque dancing and posing. In 2007, Von Teese performed at the adult entertainment event Erotica 07 in London alongside Italian rock band Belladonna.

Von Teese's first book (in collaboration with Bronwyn Garrity), which consisted of her opinions on the history of burlesque and fetish, Burlesque and the Art of the Teese / Fetish and the Art of the Teese, was published in 2006 by HarperCollins (and in New York by Regan Books). Vanity Fair called her a "Burlesque Superheroine".

Von Teese participated in the Eurovision Song Contest 2009 in Moscow, Russia, as part of the stage performance for the German entry "Miss Kiss Kiss Bang". The act placed 20th out of 25 participants in the final round of the contest. Later, she said her cleavage was censored during the show because it was too voluptuous.

Von Teese has toured the world with four full-length revues: "Strip, Strip Hooray", "The Art of the Teese", "Dita Von Teese and the Copper Coupe" and the 2019 "Glamonatrix" tour (postponed due to the COVID-19 pandemic), which continued in Europe and the UK in 2022 and the US in 2023.

=== Television and acting ===
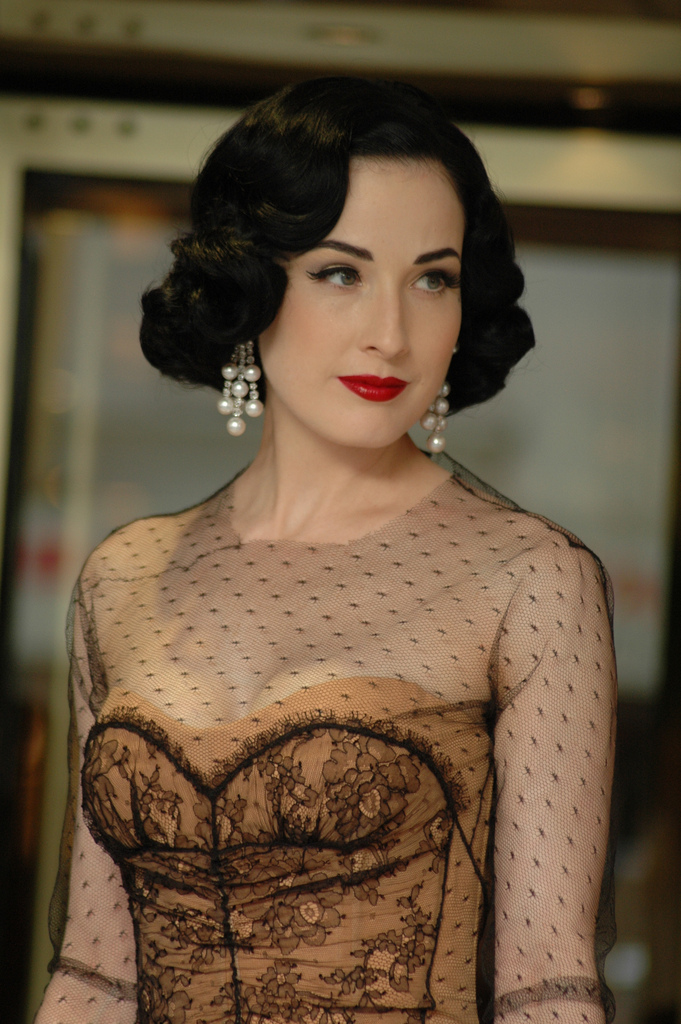
Von Teese at the 2007 Cannes Film Festival

Von Teese has performed in adult and mainstream films. In her early years, she appeared in fetish-related, softcore pornographic movies, such as Romancing Sara, Matter of Trust (in which she is billed under her real name of Heather Sweet), and also in two Andrew Blake hard-core fetish films, Pin Ups 2 and Decadence.

She has appeared in more mainstream features such as the 2005 short film, The Death of Salvador Dali, written by Delaney Bishop, which won best screenplay and best cinematography at SXSW, Raindance Film Festival, and Mill Valley Film Festival, and won Best Actress at Beverly Hills Film Festival. She starred in the feature film Saint Francis in 2007.

In addition, she has appeared in a number of music videos, including the video for the Green Day song "Redundant," the video for "Zip Gun Bop" by swing band Royal Crown Revue, Agent Provocateur's video for their cover of Joy Division's "She's Lost Control", and (performing her martini-glass burlesque routine) the video for "Mobscene" by Marilyn Manson. She was featured in a striptease/burlesque act in George Michael's live tour 2008, for the song "Feelin' Good". In addition to this, she appeared at the final of the Eurovision Song Contest 2009 as the central feature of Germany's entry, Miss Kiss Kiss Bang by Alex Swings, Oscar Sings. She also appeared in the music video "Up in the Air" by Thirty Seconds to Mars in 2013.

She stated in 2007, "I don't understand why women feel the need to go into acting as soon as they become famous ... But I suppose if the part were aesthetically correct, then maybe I could consider it."

In January 2011, Von Teese guest starred in the CBS police procedural drama series CSI: Crime Scene Investigation, in which her friend Eric Szmanda starred, in the episode "A Kiss Before Frying". She played Rita von Squeeze, a femme fatale version of herself, who seduces Szmanda's character, Greg Sanders, in a plot inspired by film noir.

In 2021, Von Teese appeared on the British version of the Fox TV series The Masked Dancer, masked as Beetroot. She was the third celebrity to be unmasked, on May 31. In September, Von Teese was a contestant in the eleventh season of Danse avec les stars, the French version of Dancing with the Stars. She was partnered with professional dancer Christophe Licata. On November 12, 2021, they were eliminated finishing 5th out of 13.

In 2022, Von Teese appeared in the music video for Taylor Swift's "Bejeweled" from her tenth studio album Midnights (2022).

=== Fashion and modeling ===
Von Teese has appeared on a number of best-dressed lists and frequents the front row of fashion shows, particularly Christian Dior, Vivienne Westwood, Jean Paul Gaultier, and Marc Jacobs, labels she is often seen wearing. Speaking of her love of Gaultier, Von Teese has said, "Jean Paul Gaultier, John Galliano, and Vivienne Westwood were the first designers that really made an impact on me. Jean Paul has a lot of the same obsessions that I do, like corsetry, ballet-peach satin and silks, black silk velvet, bullet bras and girdles. When I was a teenager, I would look for 1930s peach satin lingerie pieces to try to get his look for less, because there was no way I could afford his things back then. It was a dream come true to meet him and become friends with him. I met him the first time when I was doing my first fashion pictorial, which was for Flaunt magazine, and it was a huge story of me wearing the most important pieces from his haute couture archives, and that was a dream!"

She has also done catwalk work. During Los Angeles Fashion Week for spring 2004, she modeled for former club kid Richie Rich's fashion label, Heatherette. In 2005, she appeared in the Autumn/Winter Ready-to-Wear show for Giambattista Valli, a former designer for Ungaro, in Paris. In the 2006 Milan Fashion Week, Von Teese was on the runway, opening for the Moschino diffusion label, Moschino Cheap & Chic, autumn/winter 2006/7 show. In 2007, she appeared twice in the Jean Paul Gaultier haute couture show during the Paris Fashion Week, and again in 2014. She has starred in several ad campaigns. She appeared in Vivienne Westwood's spring/summer 2005 collection adverts and became the face of Australian clothing range Wheels & Dollbaby for their 2006/7 Spring/Summer advertising campaign. She was an ambassador/spokesmodel for HIV/AIDS awareness when she was selected (along with Eve, Debbie Harry, and Lisa Marie Presley) for MAC Cosmetics' Viva Glam VI campaign (a collection of lipsticks and lipgloss where 100% of the proceeds are for worldwide AIDS charities and to raise awareness for HIV/AIDS). Von Teese has appeared in Vanity Fair, Vogue, Elle, and international issues of nearly every fashion magazine.

Von Teese states that she never uses a stylist. "The one time I hired a stylist, they picked up a pair of my 1940s shoes and said, 'These would look really cute with jeans.' I immediately said, 'You're out of here.'" She does her own make-up, and dyes her naturally blonde hair black at home. Von Teese's unique style is "inspired by eccentric women like Luisa Casati, Anna Piaggi, and Isabella Blow." She also says, "Doing it myself is a matter of integrity and pride. I look forward to stepping out of the world and honestly stating "Yes, I did this." I love the confidence it gives me. I would feel a fraud otherwise. Truth is, it takes less time [than a stylist] for me to do it myself. It is also so much more fun! Why would I deny myself such pure pleasure?"

She has designed a new lingerie range with Wonderbra. One of Von Teese's trademark items is the garter belt with six garters instead of the usual four, with two each at the front, side seams and back. In May 2012, Von Teese launched her makeup collection "Classics" in partnership with the German cosmetic brand Art Deco. Compact powder, blushers, eye styler, eye shadows, mascara and lipstick were produced to recreate the burlesque performer's retro look.

In 2012, Von Teese launched her own clothing line and underwear line called Von Follies. In 2013, she was both model and muse for the 'Dita' 3D printed gown designed by Michael Schmidt and Francis Bitonti and 3D printed by Shapeways exactly to fit her body. Constructed of over 3,000 interlocked 3D printed components and over 12,000 Swarovski crystals it is one of the first fully articulated 3D printed garments to take the technology from haute couture to a sensual fabric-like form.

Von Teese has also worked creating her own fragrances. Her first was named Dita Von Teese (released Fall 2011) and is described by her as 'mood setting for glamour'. Her second was named Rouge (released November 2012) and is described as 'mood setting for seduction'. The third FleurTeese (released Spring 2013) is for romance and Erotique (released Fall 2013) is mood setting to be erotic. She says, "I lusted after something that would appeal to those of us not reluctant to proclaim we are women. Too many best-selling scents are so fruity and vanilla with a sweetly cloying air that a mere spritz gives me a toothache. Or they smell like cake. I do not want to smell like cake!"

In 2014, Von Teese began working with Myer, an Australian department store, on a lingerie line fronted by Australian model Stefania Ferrario.

On January 22, 2020, Von Teese walked in Jean Paul Gaultier's final couture fashion show in Paris.

== Personal life ==
Von Teese lives in Los Angeles, in a Tudor revival residence in the Hollywood Hills neighborhood. The house features early 20th-century décor, including antique taxidermy, a room dedicated to shoes, a pub house, and no white walls, something Von Teese claims she is afraid of. Among the shoes she has collected are Bettie Page's vintage fetish shoes, which she has called the "holy grail" of shoes.

She is a collector of vintage china, particularly egg cups and tea sets, and drives vintage cars. Among other vintage cars, she owned a 1939 Chrysler New Yorker from 1997 to 2010. She says, "I live to surround myself with everyday things that are beautiful. I serve my home-baked petit fours on porcelain pedestals and sip tea from flowery tea cups, charming gems from my flea market treasure hunts. I keep cosmetic brushes in vintage vase cast like the heads of ladies, complete with glamour dos and makeup. I always carry a pretty compact, maybe one scored for next to nothing on eBay."

After her marriage to Marilyn Manson ended in 2007, Von Teese dated French designer Louis-Marie de Castelbajac from 2009 to 2012. In 2012, she had a brief relationship with singer Theo Hutchcraft.

Von Teese has been in a relationship with graphic designer Adam Rajcevich since 2014.

Von Teese's friends include shoe designer Christian Louboutin, who designs shoes for her shows, burlesque performer and seamstress Catherine D'lish and writer Liz Goldwyn.

Von Teese practices Pilates and dressage.

=== Marriage to Marilyn Manson ===
Marilyn Manson had been a longtime fan of hers and was a member of her website. They first met when he asked her to dance in one of his music videos, and though she was unable to, the two remained in contact. On Manson's 32nd birthday, in 2001, she arrived with a bottle of absinthe and they became a couple. Manson proposed on March 22, 2004, and gave her a 1930s, 7-carat (1.4 g), European round-cut diamond engagement ring. On November 28, 2005, they were married in a private, non-denominational ceremony at home. A larger ceremony was held on December 3 at Castle Gurteen de la Poer in Kilsheelan, County Tipperary, Ireland, the home of their friend, Gottfried Helnwein. The wedding was officiated by surrealist film director and comic book writer Alejandro Jodorowsky. The event was featured in Vogue. Dita wore a royal purple silk taffeta gown, made by Vivienne Westwood and a tri-cornered hat designed by Stephen Jones and matching Mr. Pearl corset. Christian Louboutin designed her shoes.

On December 29, 2006, Von Teese filed for divorce from Manson citing "irreconcilable differences". Von Teese left their house empty-handed on Christmas Eve, and was not able to get in touch with Manson to inform him of her intention to divorce him. In an interview with The Daily Telegraph, Von Teese stated, "I wasn't supportive of his partying or his relationship with another girl. As much as I loved him, I wasn't going to be part of that." Von Teese also stated that she gave Manson an ultimatum, and said that "it didn't work. Instead, it made me the enemy." Von Teese did not seek spousal support and expressed no interest in his assets. The news broke for the public and for Manson on his birthday on January 5, 2007, when he was served the divorce papers.

== Filmography ==
=== Film ===
Year	Title	Role	Notes
1995	Romancing Sara	Allison	Credited as Heather Sweet
1997	Matter of Trust	Girl with C.T.	Credited as Heather Sweet
1999	Pin-Ups 2		Credited as Dita
2000	Decadence		
2001	Tickle Party: Volume 2		
2001	Slick City: The Adventures of Lela Devin	Lela Devin	Also executive producer
2002	Bound in Stockings		
2002	Naked and Helpless		
2004	Blooming Dahlia	Elizabeth Curt	Short film
2005	The Death of Salvador Dali	Gala Dalí	Short film Won Best Female Performance at the Beverly Hills Film Festival
2007	Saint Francis	Soul, Pica Bernard	
2007	High on Heels		
2007	Indie Sex	Herself	Documentary
2010	Crazy Horse Paris with Dita Von Teese	Herself	Documentary
2012	Sunset Strip	Herself	Documentary
2012	Bettie Page Reveals All	Herself	Documentary
2022	Don't Worry Darling	Herself	

=== Television ===
Year	Title	Role	Notes
2006	America's Next Top Model	Herself	Episode: "The Girl Who Graduates"
2006	Faking It	Herself	Episode: "Burlesque Special"
2009	Eurovision Song Contest	Herself	Part of the German act in "Eurovision Song Contest 2009"
2010	Sanremo Music Festival 2010	Herself	Performing during the Italian event: "Sanremo Music Festival 2010"
2010	RuPaul's Drag Race	Herself	Guest judge; episode: "Starrbootylicious"
2011	CSI: Crime Scene Investigation	Ellen Whitebridge/Agnes/Rita von Squeeze	Episode: "A Kiss Before Frying"
2012	Top Chef Masters	Herself	Guest judge; episode: "Thai One On"
2013	Oddities	Herself	Episode: "Return to Holly-Odd"
2014	Project Runway	Herself	Guest judge; episode: "Rock the Wedding"
2015	Steampunk'd	Herself	Guest judge; episode: "Grand Finale"
2016	Hell's Kitchen	Herself	Chef's table guest; episode: "15 Chefs Compete"
2016	Cupcake Wars	Herself	Celebrity Baking Contestant; episode: "Can You Spell Cupcake?"
2017	Hey Qween	Herself	Web series
2018	The Curious Creations of Christine McConnell	Vivienne	3 episodes
2021	The Masked Dancer	Beetroot	Third to be unmasked
2024	Queer Eye	Herself	Episode "She Was a Showgirl"

=== Music videos ===
Year	Title	Artist(s)
1998	"Redundant"	Green Day
2003	"Mobscene"	Marilyn Manson
2003	"Saint"	Marilyn Manson
2013	"Disintegration"	Monarchy featuring Dita Von Teese
2013	"Up in the Air"	Thirty Seconds to Mars
2014	"Ugly Boy"	Die Antwoord
2015	"Black Widow"	Monarchy
2015	"Girls & Boys" (Blur cover)	Monarchy
2016	"Gucci Coochie"	Die Antwoord
2022	"Bejeweled"	Taylor Swift

== Bibliography ==
- Von Teese, Dita; Garrity, Bronwyn (2006). Burlesque and the Art of the Teese: Fetish and the art of the teese. New York: Harper Collins/Regan Books. ISBN 978-0-06-059167-0.
- Von Teese, Dita; Rose Apodaca (2015). Your Beauty Mark: The Ultimate Guide to Eccentric Beauty. New York: HarperCollins/Dey Street Books ISBN 978-0-06-072271-5

== Discography ==
=== Studio albums ===
Title	Album details	Peak chart positions	
Title	Album details	BEL	FRA
Dita Von Teese	Released: February 16, 2018; Label: Record Makers; Formats: CD, download	140	142

=== Music singles ===
- Monarchy – "Disintegration"; featuring Dita Von Teese (2013)
- Die Antwoord – "Gucci Coochie"; featuring Dita Von Teese (2016)

=== Slot game ===
Microgaming joined forces with Eurostar Studios to release the "Burlesque by Dita" video slot in which Heather Renée Sweet makes various cameos (as paytable symbols) throughout the game. Launched in July 2021, the game has reached multiple iGaming markets worldwide, accounting for hundreds of online casinos where the game is playable in demo or real money mode.
