= The Death of Salvador Dali =

2005 American film

The Death of Salvador Dalí
- Directed by: Delaney Bishop
- Written by: Delaney Bishop
- Produced by: Daniel Long; Caryl Flemmons; Obassi Teah; Ana Terzani
- Starring: Dita Von Teese; Salvador Benavides; Mary Burton
- Cinematography: Mick Schlitzneglitz; Delaney Bishop
- Edited by: Delaney Bishop; Mick Schlitzneglitz
- Music by: Felix Brenner
- Release date: 2005
- Running time: 18 minutes
- Country: United States
- Language: English

The Death of Salvador Dalí is a 2005 American fantasy short film written and directed by Delaney Bishop. The plot concerns Salvador Dalí consulting Sigmund Freud on how to depict madness in his artwork.

Dita Von Teese won a 2006 Beverly Hills Film Festival (BHFF) Golden Palm Award for best actress for her performance in the film.

== Cast ==
- Dita Von Teese as Gala Dalí
- Salvador Benavides as Salvador Dalí
- Mary Burton as Angela
- Alejandro Cardenas as Luis Buñuel
- Robert Cesario as Sigmund Freud
- Raphael Edwards as Paul Éluard
- Alan Shearman as André Breton

== Awards ==
The film won the Jury's Special Award for Excellence in Cinematography at the Aarhus Film Festival, in Denmark in 2006. Salvador Benavides won Best Actor for his role as Salvador Dalí at the Nosotros Film Festival on August 27, 2006 in Los Angeles.
