= Alonso Duralde =

American film critic, author, and podcaster

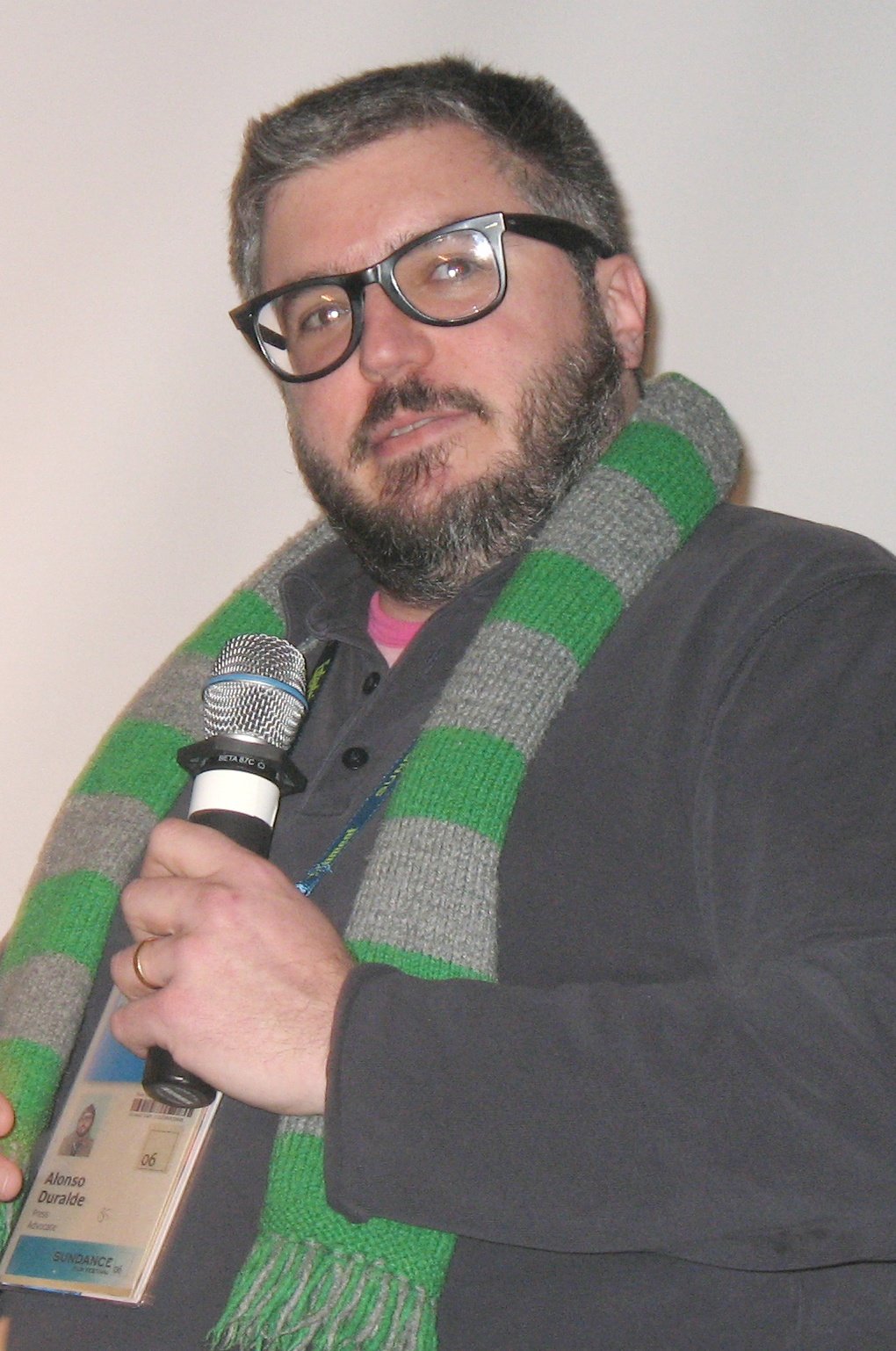
- Duralde at the 2006 Sundance Film Festival
- Born: Alonso Ampuero Duralde; May 18, 1967 (age 59); East Point, Georgia, U.S.
- Education: Vanderbilt University
- Occupations: Film critic; author; podcaster
- Spouse: Dave White

Alonso Ampuero Duralde (born May 18, 1967) is an American film critic, author, and podcaster. He has been a writer and editor for The Film Verdict, The Wrap, The Advocate and MSNBC.com.

== Early life ==
Duralde was born in East Point, Georgia, the youngest of seven children born to Spanish immigrants. He attended Vanderbilt University.

== Career ==
He was the artistic director at the USA Film Festival/Dallas for five years. He was also the former arts and entertainment editor at the national gay and lesbian magazine The Advocate. In 2007, he became the film critic for MSNBC.com, and in 2009, his reviews began appearing regularly on The Rotten Tomatoes Show.

Duralde is a member of the Los Angeles Film Critics Association and the National Society of Film Critics. His writing has appeared in The Village Voice, Movieline, and Detour.

In January 2010, Duralde was a contestant on Jeopardy!.

From 2011 to 2023, Duralde was the senior film critic for The Wrap, which also syndicated his reviews to the Reuters wire. He also co-hosted the TYT Network program What the Flick?! alongside Ben Mankiewicz of Turner Classic Movies, Christy Lemire of The Associated Press and Matt Atchity of Rotten Tomatoes. After What the Flick?! was cancelled, he and Lemire began hosting the film podcast Breakfast All Day.

In 2023, Duralde joined the website The Film Verdict as its chief U.S. film critic.

== Preferences ==
=== Best films of the year ===
- 2011: Weekend
- 2012: How to Survive a Plague
- 2013: Frances Ha
- 2014: Boyhood
- 2015: Mad Max: Fury Road
- 2016: Moonlight
- 2017: Call Me by Your Name
- 2018: Paddington 2
- 2019: Little Women
- 2020: Collective
- 2021: Licorice Pizza
- 2022: RRR
- 2023: Poor Things
- 2024: Hundreds of Beavers
- 2025: Sinners

== Personal life ==
Duralde currently lives in West Hollywood, California with his husband, fellow writer and film critic Dave White. They co-host the podcast Linoleum Knife, which began in late 2010.

== Work ==
=== Filmography ===
==== Film ====
Year	Title	Role	Notes
2006	Fabulous! The Story of Queer Cinema	Himself	
2006	The Divine Ms. Susann	Himself	
2006	The Dish on Dolls	Himself	
2006	Gotta Get Off This Merry Go Round: Sex, Dolls, and Showtunes	Himself	
2007	A Groundbreaking Success: Brokeback Mountain	Himself	
2007	Schau mir in die Augen, Kleiner	Himself	
2007	Indie Sex: Censored	Himself	TV movie
2007	Indie Sex: Teens	Critic	TV movie
2007	Indie Sex: Extremes	Himself	TV movie
2008	Starz Inside: In the Gutter	Himself	TV movie
2009	Starz Inside: Sex and the Cinema	Himself	TV movie
2009	Pornography: A Thriller	Video Store Customer	
2010	The Real Story of Christmas	Himself	TV movie
2011	Celebrity Naked Ambition	Himself	TV movie
2011	A Night at the Movies: Merry Christmas!	Interviewee	TV Movie
2013	I Am Divine	Film Critic	
2014	Hannibal: This Is My Design	Himself	
2017	The Fabulous Allan Carr	Film Critic	
2022	Tis the Season: The Holidays on Screen	Commentator	TV special
2024	Doc of Chucky	Himself	
2024	Best Christmas Movies Ever!	Himself	TV special

==== Television ====
Year	Title	Role	Notes
2009–2010	The Rotten Tomatoes Show	Himself	49 episodes
2010	Jeopardy!	Contestant	1 episode
2010	Stage 5	Host	Episode: "June 2010"
2010	The Grid	Himself	6 episodes
2011	50 Documentaries to See Before You Die	Film Critic/Author	4 episodes
2011–2017	What the Flick?!	Himself	148 episodes
2013	The Young Turks	Guest	2 episodes
2016	Screen Junkies Movie Fights	Himself	Episode: "What is the Most Influential Film? - CLASSIC FILM FIGHTS!!"
2017	America: Facts vs. Fiction	Himself	Episode: "Smoking, Drinking, and Gambling"
2017–2020	Movie Trivia Schmoedown	Himself	6 episodes
2018	Movie Trivia Schmoedown Exhibition	Commentator	Episode: "Holiday Movies! Reilly/Howard/Chandler/Rocha
2019	The Movies	Himself	6 episodes
2022	Queer for Fear: The History of Queer Horror	Himself	4 episodes
2024	On the Rocks	Guest	Episode: "Film critic/podcaster/writer Alonso Duralde's Take on Queer Hollywood History"
2026	Critical Thinking	Himself	2 episodes

==== Audio ====
Year	Title	Role	Notes
2014	Bret Easton Ellis Podcast	Himself	Episode: "Alonso Duralde"
2018–2024	Deck the Hallmark	Himself	169 episodes
2019	The Film Scene with Illeana Douglas	Guest	Episode: "Alonso Duralde's Top 5 Christmas Films"
2021	My Brother, My Brother, and Me	Himself	Episode: "MaxFun Block Party: Movie Advice with Maximum Film"
2022–2024	Feminist Frequency Radio	Guest	2 episodes
2024	Go Fact Yourself	Contestant	Episode: "Blair Socci & Alonso Duralde"
2024	The Cinematography Podcast	Himself	Episode: "Hollywoods rainbow: Hollywood Pride with Alonso Duralde"
2025	Girls Gone Hallmark	Himself	Episode: "The Chicken Sisters 2.7 featuring Alonso Duralde"

=== Bibliography ===
- 101 Must-See Movies for Gay Men. New York: Alyson Books. 2005. ISBN 9781555838669.
- Have Yourself a Movie Little Christmas. Lanham, Maryland: Limelight Editions. 2010. ISBN 9780879103767.; Have Yourself a Movie Little Christmas: Revised & Updated Edition. Bloomsbury Academic. 2025. ISBN 9781493087440.
- Gray, Brandon; Thompson, Daniel; Pandolph, Daniel; Duralde, Alonso (2021). I'll Be Home for Christmas Movies: The Deck the Hallmark Podcast's Guide to Your Holiday TV Obsession. Running Press. ISBN 9780762499359.
- Hollywood Pride: A Celebration of LGBTQ+ Representation and Perseverance in Film. Turner Classic Movies. Running Press. 2024. ISBN 9780762485895.
