= Indie Sex =

- Directed by: Lesli Klainberg
- Theme music composer: Douglas J. Cuomo
- Country of origin: United States
- Original language: English

Production
- Cinematography: Ruben O'Malley; John Tanzer
- Editors: Judd Blaise; Hope Litoff
- Running time: 199 minutes
- Production company: Orchard Films

Original release
- Release: July 21, 2007

Indie Sex is a 2007 American television documentary film directed by Lesli Klainberg.

== Synopsis ==
The four-part documentary series that explores sexuality as it is presented and received in films and throughout film history. The movie looks at how film and policy makers have attempted to censor and free sexual images, whether it be through regulations or exploring topics such as teen sex, sexual taboos, or pushing material to sexual extremes. Discussions range from the Pre-Code film era as early as the 1910s to modern cinema.

== Featured in Indie Sex ==
- Dita Von Teese
- Heather Matarazzo
- Peter Sarsgaard
- Guinevere Turner
- Alonso Duralde
- Colette Burson
- Dana Stevens
- Jami Bernard
- Catherine Breillat
