= Pat McGrath =

British make-up artist

Dame Pat McGrath DBE
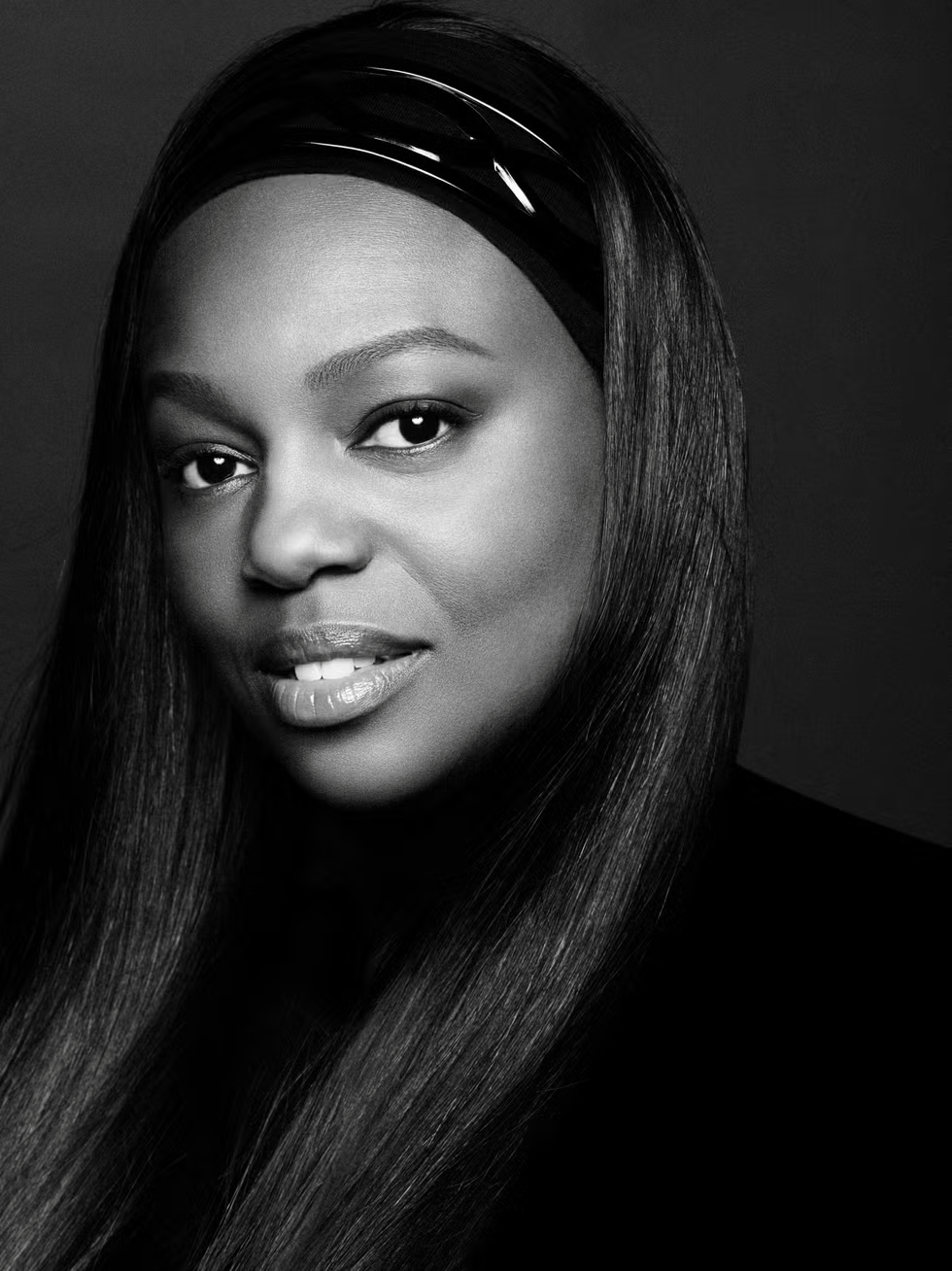
- McGrath in 2011
- Born: Patricia Ann McGrath; 1970 (age 55–56); Northampton, England
- Occupation: Make-up artist

Dame Patricia Ann McGrath DBE (born 1970) is a British make-up artist. She has been called the most influential make-up artist in the world by Vogue magazine and other commentators. In 2019 she was included in Time's list of the 100 most influential people. She is the first make-up artist to be made a Dame Commander of the British Empire. In 2025 she was announced as creative director of cosmetics for La Beauté Louis Vuitton.

== Early life ==
McGrath was born in Northampton, England, in 1970. She was raised in a working-class household by her single mother, Jean, a Jamaican immigrant and Jehovah's Witness. She described her upbringing as "very religious, very conservative". Jean, who worked as a dressmaker, introduced McGrath to make-up and fashion. She completed an art foundation course at Northampton College, but it did not include topics such as fashion or make-up.

== Career ==
In the 1980s, McGrath moved to London and became involved with designers such as Alexander McQueen and John Galliano. In the early 1990s, McGrath worked alongside Edward Enninful at i-D magazine, although she continued to work as a receptionist to support herself financially. In 1999 she was hired by Giorgio Armani to collaborate on a new range of cosmetics. From 2004 McGrath was employed by Procter & Gamble, as Global Cosmetics Creative Design Director for several years with a salary rumoured to be over $1 million.

In 2015 she launched Pat McGrath Labs, her own line of beauty products which by 2019 had become a $1 billion company and the biggest selling beauty line at Selfridges. In 2017, McGrath was hired by Enninful as Beauty Editor-at-Large for British Vogue. In 2018, six actors, including Saoirse Ronan, Naomie Harris and Sara Sampaio, wore Pat McGrath Labs make-up to the Fashion Awards.

In March 2025, fashion brand Louis Vuitton announced it would begin selling beauty products, under the name La Beauté Louis Vuitton, in fall 2025 and tapped McGrath as creative director for the new venture. According to Forbes, McGrath's official title is Creative Director of Cosmetics. McGrath's collaboration with Louis Vuitton on the collection came after her longstanding relationship with the house's artistic director of women's collections, Nicolas Ghesquière, with whom McGrath has worked since his 2014 debut at the brand. The product line was developed over five years in a confidential process that included McGrath visiting and drawing inspiration from the historic home and atelier of Louis Vuitton in Asnières-sur-Seine, on the outskirts of Paris. The line officially launched on August 29, 2025. In October 2025, McGrath was the head make-up artist for the 2025 Victoria's Secret Fashion Show. McGrath designed the make-up for models walking in the show, including Quenlin Blackwell and Women's National Basketball Association player Angel Reese, using products from her line, Pat McGrath Labs. In November 2025, McGrath was honored as one of the 2025 Glamour Award Women of the Year.

In December 2025, Pat McGrath Labs put itself and its assets up for sale via an auction bid in an effort to reset its operations after losing a majority of its revenue caused by limited consumer demand and heightened competition. The auction bid was tossed in January 2026 after the company filed for Chapter 11 bankruptcy protection. The company exited bankruptcy after being sold to GDA Luma Capital Management in April 2026.

== Artistry ==
According to Vogue, McGrath is known for her unique, adventurous, and innovative make-up techniques which include using her hands as opposed to brushes. She uses bold colour shades and experiments with materials ranging from feathers to ornaments. Her experiments result in a wide of looks. As a result, she is considered to have re-introduced old make-up ideas and developed new ones.

=== Inspiration ===
McGrath has said of her career: "I really love being a makeup artist. It never gets mundane or predictable and every shoot and show is different." She draws inspiration from many sources, using materials such as feathers, gold leaf, and leather. McGrath told Vogue in 2008, "I'm influenced a lot by the fabrics I see, the colours that are in the collections and the girl's faces. It's always a challenge but that's the key – to make it different every time." Her inspiration started with her mother, particularly her love for fashion, film and costumes: "Everything that she was obsessed with, I became obsessed with." McGrath's mother encouraged her stating "It will be a problem for you if you don't love what you do. So make sure!" Growing up in London, McGrath and her mother used to go makeup shopping when she was six years old. Fashion became a huge inspiration for McGrath, stimulating her creative career trajectory.

McGrath also looks to models that bring her personal inspiration. McGrath says, "They are their own women, representing a mix of ethnicities, sizes, and backgrounds, they allow me to experiment and create the looks I dream of in my head." She considers models Naomi Campbell, Hailey Baldwin, Paloma Elsesser, Jasmine Sanders, Mallory Merk and Ruby Aldridge as her muses. She says of Campbell, "We've worked together since the mid-1990s, and she inspires me in ways I've never imagined. There is no one like Naomi." McGrath calls Paloma Elsesser's face "the ultimate canvas", for her hypnotic complexion that "guides a makeup artist's touch."

Much of McGrath's inspiration derives from an individual's natural skin. As a consequence her own makeup lines focus on luminous aspects of skin. McGrath says, "Flawless, luminous skin has always been a constant in my work. For years I've been using a custom mix of products to achieve different levels of luminosity from fresh baby skin to a supercharged power-glow." The sequin packaging of her makeup also derives from McGrath's inspiration by sequins, a reoccurring element in many of her looks. On the definition of beauty, she believes that "real and true beauty comes from within. It's like an energy, because the task of bringing out beauty—and at times creating it—really is like a puzzle. Often in my work, the approach to beauty is to seek perfection, yet sometimes beauty is imperfect or quite raw."

== Recognition ==
- 2000, 2001: Pantene Pro-V Make-Up Artist Of The Year
- 2014: Member of the Order of the British Empire (MBE) for services to the fashion and beauty industry
- 2017: Isabella Blow Award for Fashion Creator at the Fashion Awards
- 2021: Dame Commander of the Order of the British Empire (DBE) for services to the fashion and beauty industry and diversity
- 2024: The London Design Medal at the London Design Festival

McGrath has also regularly appeared in the Top 10 of the Powerlist, highlighting the most influential Black British people across a number of industries.

== Filmography ==
=== Music videos ===
Year	Title	Artist	Role	Ref
2022	"Bejeweled"	Taylor Swift	Queen Pat	
