= Catherine de Castelbajac =

American fashion model and journalist

Catherine "Kate" de Castelbajac (born Katherine Lee Chambers in Santa Barbara, California) is a former model and fashion journalist who now works as an image consultant and educator. She is the founder of CdeC Academy of Santa Barbara and is affiliated with the Association of Image Consultants International.

== Early life and education ==
Kate Chambers was born in Santa Barbara, California, to William Joseph Chambers and Lillian Chambers, and graduated from Foothill High School in Santa Ana, California. While a senior at Barnard College of Columbia University, where she earned a BA in English literature, Chambers was discovered by the photographer Jean Pagliuso and the editors of Mademoiselle. She became the subject of an article in the September 1975 issue entitled "The Makings of a Model", in which she was transformed from student to model. Castelbajac continued her education at Simmons University, where she earned an MBA in 1996.

== Career ==
=== Modelling ===
The Mademoiselle feature helped launch Chambers into a career in high fashion, as she began working with the Ford Modeling Agency and such photographers as Arthur Elgort and Patrick Demarchelier, appearing in magazines like Harper's Bazaar. Eileen Ford then sent her to Paris, where, in October 1976, she met fashion designer Jean-Charles de Castelbajac. The two were married in 1979. They had two sons together.

During the late 1970s and early 1980s she was among the most popular models in Europe, working for French Vogue, Elle, Cosmopolitan, and represented the line of cosmetics Orlane B23. She also appeared in several runway shows for Chloé, Karl Lagerfield, Chanel, and Issey Miyake.

=== Fashion, journalism, and business careers ===
While she continued modeling for a time after her marriage, Castelbajac shifted over time to the business side as well as doing journalism. She began her business career in 1983, working as the accessory director for her husband's design company, Jean Charles de Castelbajac, SA., a position she continued until her divorce in 1995. She also began to contribute articles to InStyle magazine in 1989, and accepted a position as a founding editor of the women's magazine Mirabella, covering European trends. Harper's Bazaar said of her, "Accomplished, charming and refreshingly candid, Kate brings her personal brand of elan to everything she does."

In 1995, she published a book depicting the history of cosmetics, The Face of the Century. It chronicled how faces had changed during the 20th century and the economic, social, artistic reasons for those changes. The International Herald Tribune described it as a combination of "lucid text [and] well-chosen images."

She continues to work in the fashion business. She ran a fashion company for several years. She focused on teaching etiquette to professionals and corporate executives. Currently, Castelbajac is the CEO of Le Void, Inc., a lifestyle company she owns with her son, Louis Marie de Castelbajac.

== Personal life ==
Castelbajac was sued in 1995 by energy magnate Bill Koch to evict her from his $2.5 million condominium at the Four Seasons Hotel in Boston. Koch alleged that he had allowed her to move in so she could attend Simmons College, as he seldom used the apartment. In 1994, however, Koch married Joan Granlund, with whom he had a son. When he tried to end the relationship with Castelbajac, she refused to move out and claimed Koch had broken his promises to her. A jury ruled in Koch's favor after a trial noted for its disclosure of torrid letters and faxes between the two.

Castelbajac subsequently had a relationship with actor Ron Silver that lasted until his death in 2009. She lives in Marina del Rey, California.

== Bibliography ==
- (as Kate de Castelbajac) The Face of the Century: 100 Years of Makeup and Style. New York: Rizzoli, 1995.
- Benaim, Laurence. "Citizen Kate, Au Pays de Castelbajac". French Vogue August 1989.
- Castelbajac, Catherine de. "What's In Paris". In Style, July 1989.
- "Kate Takes Off, The Makings of a Model". Mademoiselle Magazine, September 1975.
- Mehren, Elizabeth. "Steamy Romance Turns Frosty in Boston". Los Angeles Times, December 5, 1995.
- Menkes, Suzy. "Books About Fashion: A Feast for the Eyes and Some Food for Thought". International Herald Tribune, December 19, 1995.
- Petkanas, Christopher. "Multitalented Muse, Kate de Castelbajac". Harper's Bazaar, February 1989.
- Radkai, Karen. "The Thrill of Discovery". American Vogue, June 1984.
