= Castelbajac =

- Commune
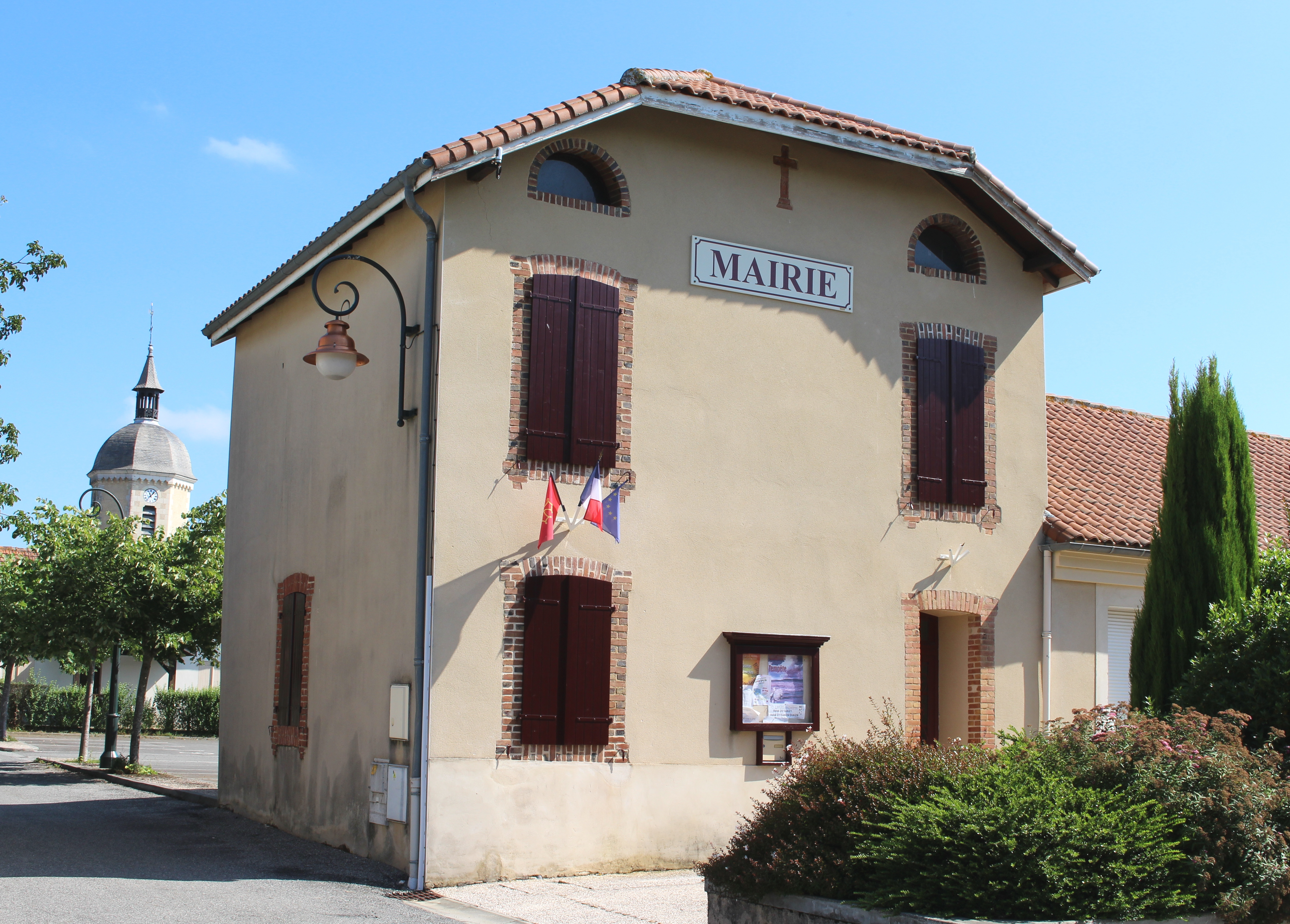
- View of Castelbajac

- Coat of arms
- Location of Castelbajac
- Location within France Location within Occitanie
- Coordinates: 43°11′00″N 0°21′21″E
- Country: France
- Region: Occitania
- Department: Hautes-Pyrénées
- Arrondissement: Bagnères-de-Bigorre
- Canton: La Vallée de l'Arros et des Baïses
- Intercommunality: Plateau de Lannemezan

Government
  - Mayor (2020–2026): Jean-Marc Dupouy
- Area^{1}: 8.2 km^{2} (3.2 sq mi)
- Elevation: 520 m (1,710 ft)
- Highest elevation: 546 m (1,791 ft)
- Lowest elevation: 362 m (1,188 ft)
- Population (2023): 132
  - Density: 16/km^{2} (42/sq mi)
- Time zone: UTC+01:00 (CET)
  - Summer (DST): UTC+02:00 (CEST)
- INSEE/Postal code: 65128 /65330
- ^{1} French Land Register data, which excludes lakes, ponds, glaciers > 1 km^{2} (0.386 sq mi or 247 acres) and river estuaries.

Castelbajac (French pronunciation: [kastɛlbaʒak]; Occitan: Castèthbajac) is a commune in the Hautes-Pyrénées department in south-western France.

== Notable people ==
- Jean-Charles de Castelbajac
- Barthélemy Dominique Jacques de Castelbajac

== See also ==
- Communes of the Hautes-Pyrénées department
