= Jasmine Sanders =

American model and fashion influencer (born 1991)

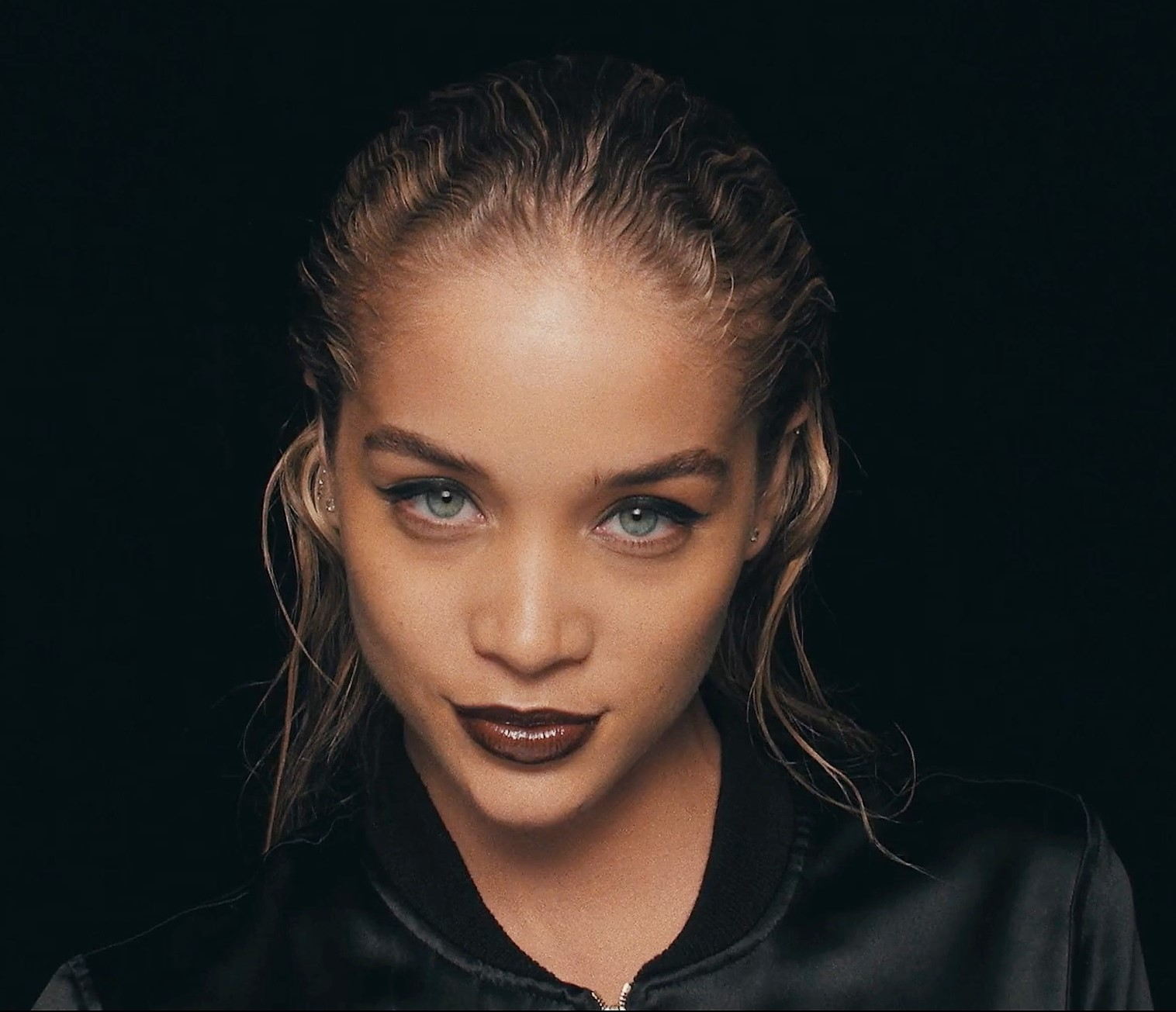
- Sanders in 2016
- Born: June 22, 1991 (age 35); Frankenthal, Germany
- Years active: 2004–present
- Modeling information
- Height: 1.73 m (5 ft 8 in)
- Hair color: Blonde
- Eye color: Blue
- Agency: The Society Management (New York); Elite Model Management (Paris, Milan); Storm Management (London); Model Management (Hamburg); VISION (Los Angeles)

Jasmine Sanders (born June 22, 1991), also known as Golden Barbie, is an American model and fashion influencer.

== Early life ==
Sanders was born in 1991 in Frankenthal, Germany to a German mother and an African-American father; she was raised in Columbia, South Carolina.

== Career ==
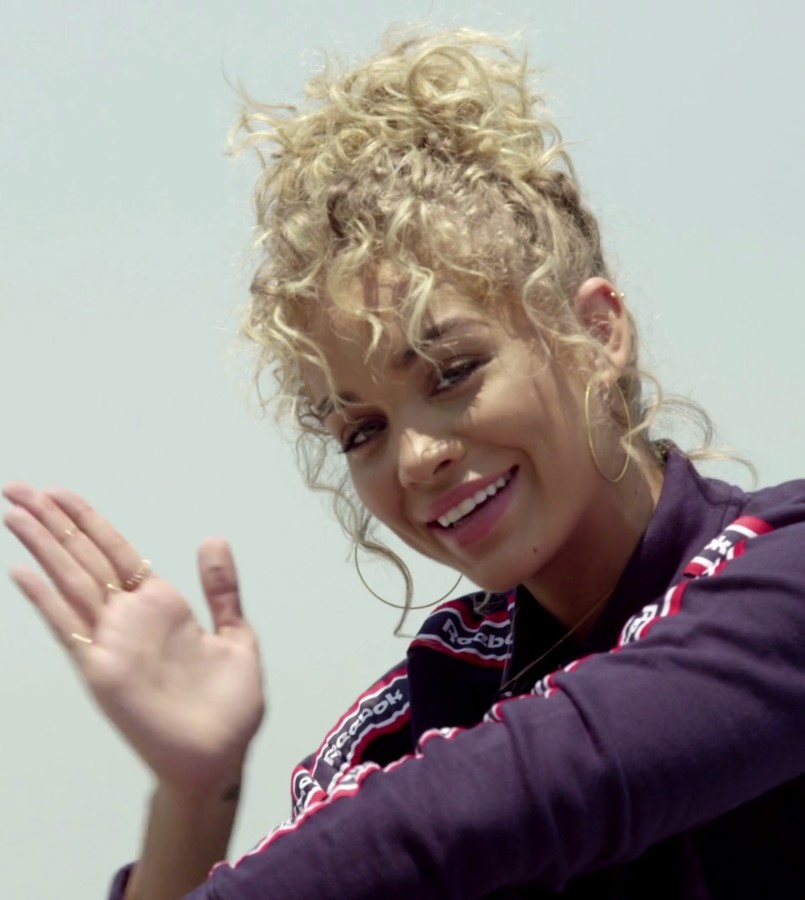
Sanders in April 2018

Sanders started her career as a teenager, modeling for Seventeen, Free People, Nike, and ALDO shoes. She made a shift towards high fashion work by walking the runway for Miu Miu's S/S 2016 show. She has also appeared in runway shows for designers including Moschino, Ralph Lauren, DKNY, Jeremy Scott, Julien MacDonald, and Philip Plein.

Sanders has appeared in editorials for American Vogue, Vogue Italia, British Vogue, Vogue Russia, Vogue Arabia, LOVE, Allure, CR Fashion Book, Esquire, Glamour, GQ, Interview and W. Sanders has appeared on numerous magazine covers, including the November 2018 cover of the Turkish edition of Elle Magazine, Harper's Bazaar Kazakhstan, Harper's Bazaar Mexico, InStyle Russia, L'Officiel Switzerland, Lui Magazine, Ocean Drive, Treats!, Wonderland Magazine, and Maxim in late 2019. She has had advertising campaigns for Bvlgari, Roberto Cavalli, MCM, Ralph Lauren, Ugg, Gap, Victoria's Secret PINK, and American Eagle. Sanders has worked with photographers like Steven Klein, Inez & Vinoodh, Cass Bird, Patrick Demarchelier, Glen Luchford, Alasdair McLellan, Ezra Petronio, Sølve Sundsbø, Ellen von Unwerth, and Gilles Bensimon.

Sanders is a muse of makeup artist Pat McGrath. In 2017, Sanders became a spokesmodel for Reebok, and designed her own sneaker which launched in December 2017.

Models.com ranks her as one of the "Sexiest Models". Sanders appeared in the 2019 edition of the Sports Illustrated Swimsuit Issue, and was named Rookie of the Year. She appeared on the cover of the 2020 issue alongside Kate Bock and Olivia Culpo.

Sanders has appeared on NBC's Extra as a special correspondent, as a guest judge on America's Next Top Model and American Beauty Star, and a contestant on VH1's Hip-Hop Squares. In 2015, Sanders appeared on an episode of MTV's Catfish: The TV Show when a woman was using her images under the name "Trinity".

== Personal life ==
From 2016 to 2018, she was in a relationship with actor Terrence J. Sanders began a relationship with professional coach Anthony Rhoades in 2020, and the couple have tattoos of each other's names.

== Filmography ==
Film and television roles
Year	Title	Role	Notes
2014	School Dance	Jasmine	Film
2015	Catfish: The TV Show	Herself	Season 4, Episode 13
2016–17	Extra	Herself	3 episodes
2017	America's Next Top Model	Herself / model	Episode: "Major Key Alert"
2017–19	Hip Hop Squares	Herself / Panelist	4 episodes
2019	Lindsay Lohan's Beach Club	Herself / VIP Guest	Episode: "Lindsay's Choice"
2019	Scream	Nurse	Episode: "Blindspots"
