= Juan Delgadillo =

Juan Delgadillo may refer to:

- Juan Delgadillo (baseball) (born 1982), Mexican pitcher who played in 2014 Caribbean Series
- Juan Delgadillo, restaurant owner, of Delgadillo's Snow Cap Drive-In
