= Robert A. Delgadillo =

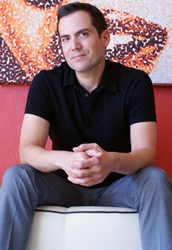
- Robert A. Delgadillo also known as RAD.
- Born: Los Angeles, California, U.S.
- Education: Savannah College of Art and Design
- Known for: Artist
- Notable work: Temptation; Say Wabbit; Glitz and Goodness
- Website: www.artofrad.com

Robert A. Delgadillo is an American artist whose art celebrates themes in popular culture. Delgadillo draws inspiration from fashion, films and iconic celebrities that he identifies with.

== Biography ==
=== Early life ===
Robert A. Delgadillo was born in Los Angeles, California and showed an interest in art from an early age. He states that Hollywood and the animated films of Walt Disney made a major impression on him as a child and inspired him to pursue art as a career.

=== Education ===
He spent several years studying the human form taking life drawing courses and attending drawing workshops throughout the Los Angeles area. He is stated as saying that he attributes his greatest academic influence to having studied fashion illustration in the mid 1990s. Delgadillo studied graphic design at the Art Institute of California in Orange County, California and graduated with honors. He pursued his graduate studies in illustration at the Savannah College of Art and Design in Savannah, Georgia where he earned a master's degree.

=== Early career (2005-2009) ===
Delgadillo began his art career doing portraits for celebrities including Paris Hilton, Justin Timberlake, Ashton Kutcher and Demi Moore, Nicole Richie, Paz Vega, Ryan Seacrest and Victoria Beckham. During this period he created numerous works of art inspired by popular themes in Pop Culture with emphasis on contemporary and iconic celebrities.

He earned a living as a commercial artist illustrating and art directing a series of successful advertisements for Beverly Hills boutique Kitson that were published in a variety of magazines including Vogue and Vanity Fair. His illustrations for Kitson also appeared on billboards throughout the United States and in point of purchase displays in Nordstroms department stores. The popular advertisements ran in magazines from 2005-2009. In 2006, Delgadillo took on the challenge of branding for Los Angeles based talent agency Sutton, Barth and Vennari. His illustrated advertisements for the Los Angeles based talent agency would appear at the Golden Trailer and Key Art Awards that same year.

=== Exhibitions and major projects (2005–present) ===
His first solo art exhibition was in 2005 in Beverly Hills, the exhibit featured works of art Delgadillo created inspired by contemporary pop icons including Gwen Stefani and Dita Von Teese, as well as classic Hollywood screen idols such as actress Marilyn Monroe. His work of art entitled Temptation, depicting Brad Pitt and Angelina Jolie as Adam and Eve, earned the artist recognition on an international level including a feature story in In Touch Weekly magazine in (October 24, 2005).

In June 2012 Delgadillo's artworks based on the life of actress Marilyn Monroe were featured in an exhibit at the Hollywood Museum in Hollywood California. Various of his illustrations of Monroe were included during a report televised on the tv show Inside Edition and Hello Hollywood (China).

In February 2013 Delgadillo debuted an art series titled "MOD" at the M Modern Gallery in Palm Springs. The artwork was inspired by 1960's fashion and pop culture. Delgadillo gave an extensive interview to the Desert Sun Newspaper.

In June 2013 Delgadillo debuted two art pieces at the Egyptian Theater, Hollywood, commemorating the 75th Anniversary of the film "The Wizard of Oz". Delgadillo created illustrations of the two witches from the film, Glinda the Good and the Wicked Witch of the West. His artwork based on the film would also be on public exhibition at the Chuck Jones Galleries in both Costa Mesa and San Diego California.

In 2014 Delgadillo collaborated with Chuck Jones Enterprises and Warner Bros. Entertainment creating illustrations featuring cartoon characters from Looney Tunes. His illustration "Say Wabbit" was featured on canvas prints and distributed with retailers including Wayfair, Walmart and All Posters.

The artist created artwork for the Estate of Marilyn Monroe in 2015, illustrating various works inspired by the late actress.

In 2017, two of the artist's illustrations of Tejano singer Selena Quintanilla were featured in Google Arts and Culture as part of the Selena Museum Collection virtual exhibit.

In 2018 Delgadillo collaborated with The Estate of Mahatma Gandhi and The Beanstalk group to create a collection of images based on the likeness of Gandhi for licensing.

Delgadillo designed the 2019 Fiesta De La Flor logo, featuring his illustration of Tejano singer Selena Quintanilla.

== Selected group exhibitions ==
- 2017: "The Selena Museum Collection" Google Arts and Culture
- 2013: "Were Off To See The Wizard- The Wizard of Oz 75th Anniversary Group Art Show" The Chuck Jones Gallery, Costa Mesa
- 2013: "The Wizard of Oz 75th Anniversary Group Art Show" The Chuck Jones Gallery, San Diego
- 2013: "The Wizard of Oz 75th Anniversary Group Art Show" Egyptian Theater, Hollywood
- 2013: "Retro-A-Rama Group Show", M Modern Gallery, Palm Springs
- 2012: "Marilyn The Exhibit: An Intimate Look At The Legend," The Hollywood Museum, Hollywood
- 2010: "The Art of Glamour Fashion Show," Rancho Cucamonga Playhouse, Rancho Cucamonga
- 2005: "Solo Exhibit: POP Life," Beverly Hills

== Personal life ==
Robert A. Delgadillo lives and designs in his hometown of Los Angeles, California.
