= Catherine D'lish =

American burlesque performer

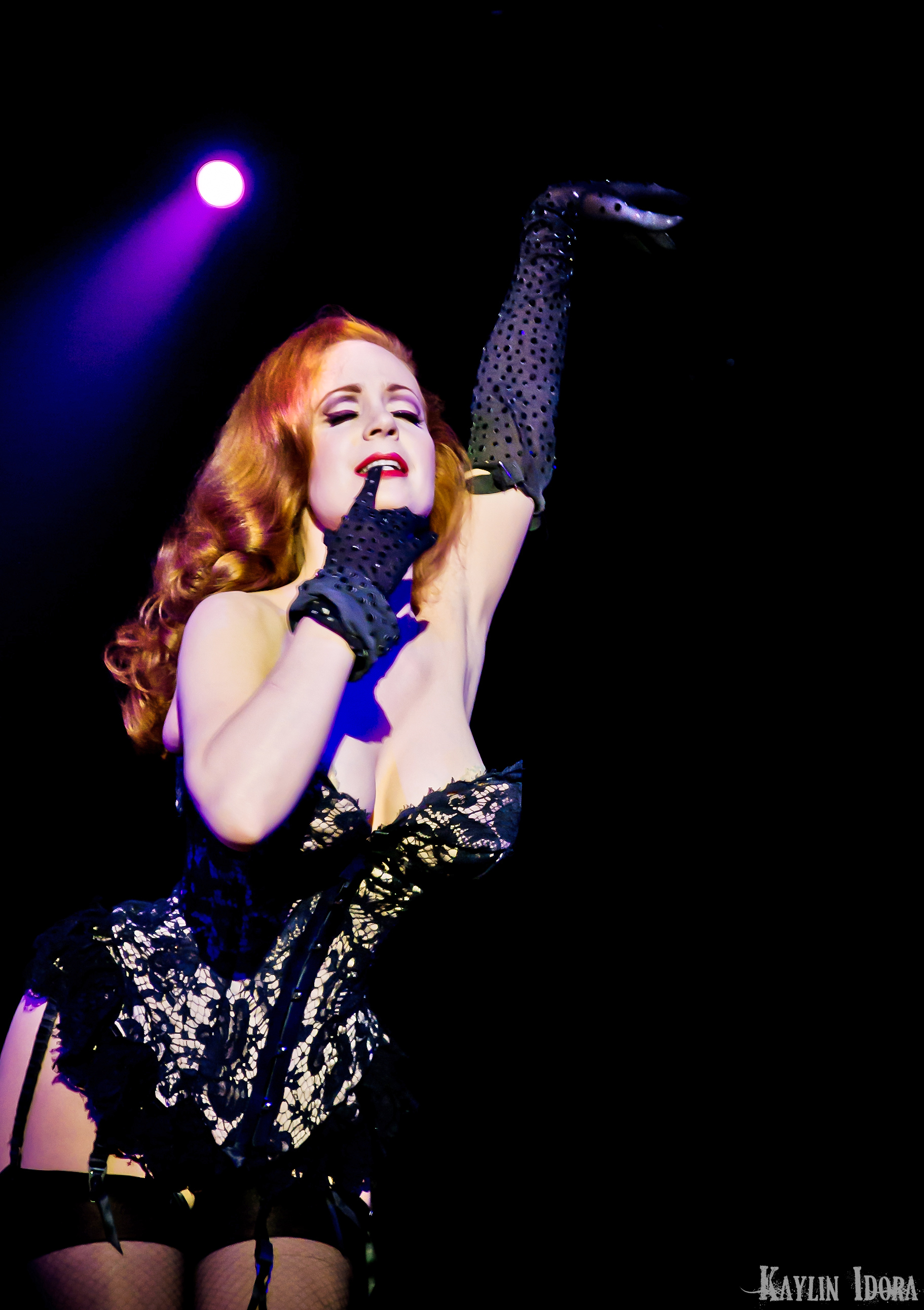
Catherine D'Lish New Orleans Burlesque Festival 2010

Catherine D’lish is an American performance artist specializing in classical strip tease and burlesque.

== Career ==
D'Lish uses elaborate costumes, and decorative props are part of her show. She has been the headlining performer at multiple events in the burlesque genre, including the 50th anniversary celebration of Playboy. Las Vegas shows were held at the Riviera, Stardust, Tropicana, Bally's, and Caesars Palace. Her acts include such elements of classic striptease as the bubble bath, the birdcage and the spider's web.

== Awards ==
D'lish's titles include winner of Miss Exotic World in 1992 and 1994.

== Personal life ==
Catherine D’lish has performed with Dita Von Teese and is also a friend of hers. She was one of the 60 guests to attend Von Teese's wedding to Marilyn Manson on December 3, 2005, in a non-denominational ceremony in County Tipperary, Ireland.
