= Beverly Hills Film Festival =

Film festival in California, United States

- Location: Beverly Hills, California, U.S.
- Established: 2000
- Founded by: Nino Simone

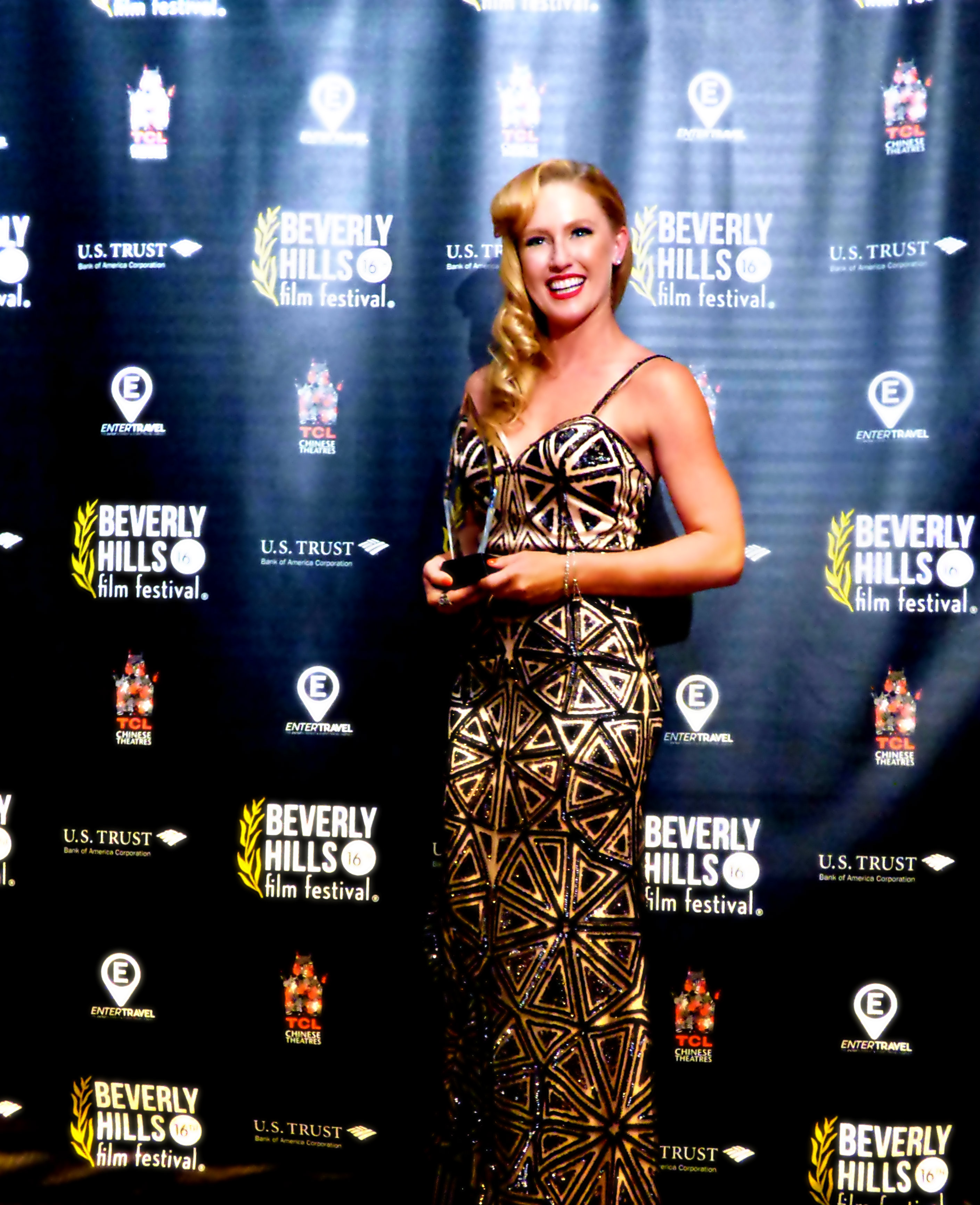
Beverly Hills Film Festival

The Beverly Hills Film Festival (BHFF) is a film festival in the United States founded in 2000 by independent filmmaker Nino Simone. The festival is an international competition dedicated to "showcasing the art and talent of emerging filmmakers and screenplay writers from around the world".

The festival lasts five days and is reportedly attended by more than 55,000 people a year. Venues include the AMPAS, Writers Guild, Chinese Theater and The Clarity Theatre. The festival winds up with the black tie awards ceremony. In 2013, the festival was launched internationally with an event in Tokyo.

The BHFF emphasizes awards to established filmmakers. On the final night of the festival, the jury presents its awards, including the Golden Palm Award for best picture, at a black-tie gala at the Four Seasons Beverly Wilshire Hotel.

The festival organizers canceled the 2020 event due to the COVID-19 concerns and lockdown orders in place at the time.
