= Jean-Charles de Castelbajac =

French fashion designer

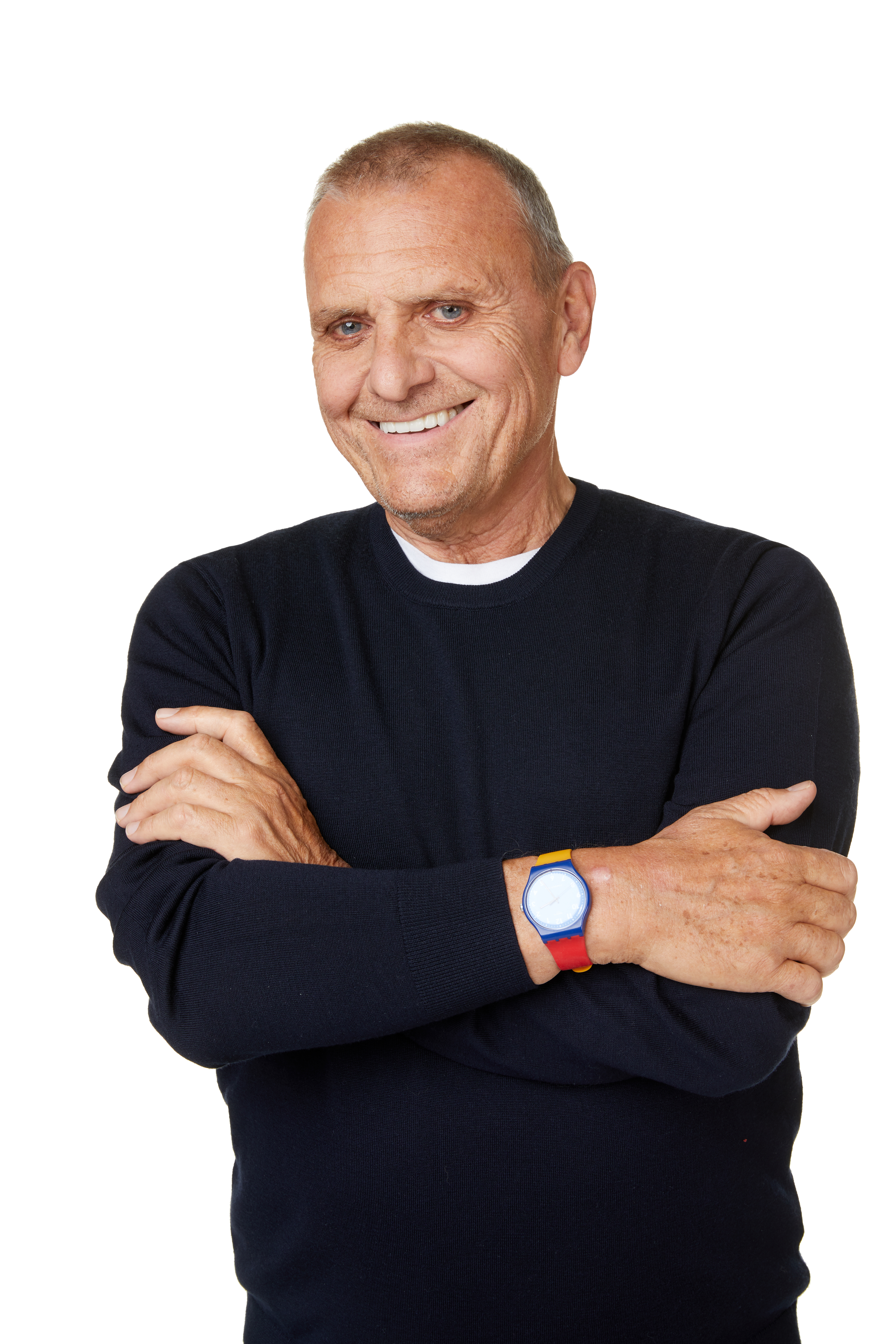
- Born: 28 November 1949 (age 76); Casablanca, French Morocco
- Children: Louis-Marie de Castelbajac; Guilhem de Castelbajac; Eugénie de Castelbajac
- Website: jeancharlesdecastelbajac.com

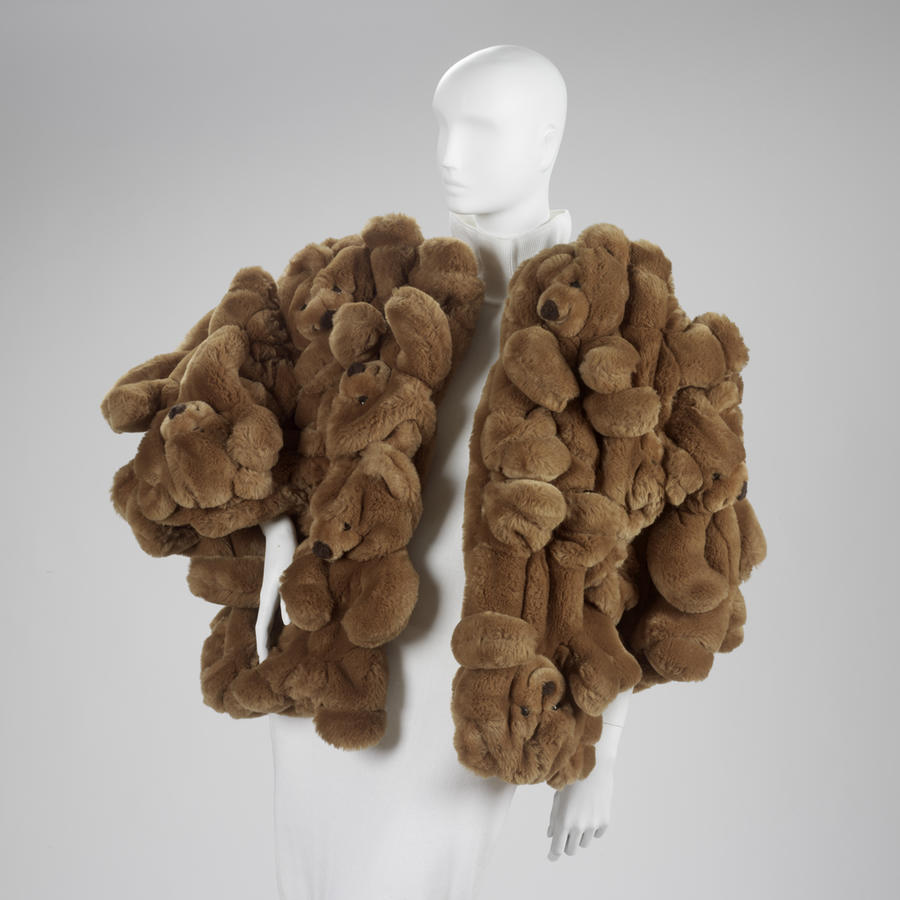
Arche de Noé (Teddy Bear Jacket), Winter 1988-89 (RISD Museum)

Jean-Charles, marquis de Castelbajac (born 28 November 1949), also known as JC/DC, is a French fashion designer.

== Career ==
He has enjoyed international success with some of his creations, including a coat of teddy bears worn by pop star Madonna and by supermodel Helena Christensen in the film Prêt-à-Porter, a sequined jacket for Beyonce, and a Donald Duck costume for Rihanna. During his career he has befriended and worked with artists such as Andy Warhol, Keith Haring, Jean Michel Basquiat, Malcolm McLaren, Robert Mapplethorpe, M.I.A, Cassette Playa, Curry & Coco, The Coconut Twins, and Lady Gaga.

His fashion archive was showcased in preparation for his retrospective "Gallie Rock" in Paris by photographers Tim and Barry, modelled by Cassette Playa, M.I.A., Jammer, Matthew Stone, Slew Dem Crew, and others.

His creations have been displayed at New York's Fashion Institute of Technology, London's Victoria and Albert Museum and the Galliera Museum in Paris. In 2015, he created a 3,700 m2 "Mural for Orly Airport in Paris".

As well as his imaginative clothing collections, the designer creates home furnishings and has designed a watch inspired by Lego. He also has collaborated with Swatch, Weston, Ligne Roset, Petit Bateau, Citroën, Tecnica, Kway, Coca-Cola, Vilebrequin, Aigle, Rossignol, and Palace skateboards.

All the artistic environments he touches on have his signature rainbow chromatic range in common. One of the best examples of this is the line he created for Pope John Paul II, 500 bishops, and 5,000 priests for the 1997 World Youth Day in Paris.

As Keith Haring initiated him to street art, Jean-Charles de Castelbajac uses chalk to leave his poetic mark on the walls of the world's capitals.

His career as a fashion designer started in 1968 alongside his mother, when he created Ko & Co. The first "manifesto" piece of clothing he produced using the blanket he used when he was at boarding school.

In the late ’60s, two decades before Martin Margiela, he was the first to use upcycled materials, fashioning clothes out of mops, blankets, and medical bandages.

He founded maison Jean-Charles de Castelbajac in 1978, which he left in 2016.

Between the 1970s and the 1990s, de Castelbajac was also the artistic director of fashion houses including Max Mara and Courrèges and he co-founded Iceberg in 1974. In 1979, in consonance with pop art, he designed cartoon pullovers that have since become iconic.

In 2005, Raika was the de Castelbajac ready-to-wear license holder in Japan with retail value of €20 million. He also attended King of kitsch at Paris Fashion Week in 2010.

In 2017, he collaborated with smartphone maker OnePlus to release a collection called the "Callection" that was centred around a limited edition OnePlus 5 smartphone.

In 2018, he was named artistic director for the Benetton Group.

In 2019, he collaborated with Palace Skateboards to release a collection featuring clothing, hats, and playing cards.

He was asked to design the official vestments worn by the clergy at the re-opening of Cathédrale de Notre Dame de Paris at Île de la Cite, on 7 December 2024.

A major retrospective exhibition titled L’Imagination au pouvoir is dedicated to him at Les Abattoirs, Toulouse, from December 2025 to August 2026.
