= Delgadillo's Snow Cap Drive-In =

Historic eatery and roadside attraction on Route 66 in Seligman, Arizona

Coordinates: 35°19′34″N 112°52′23″W

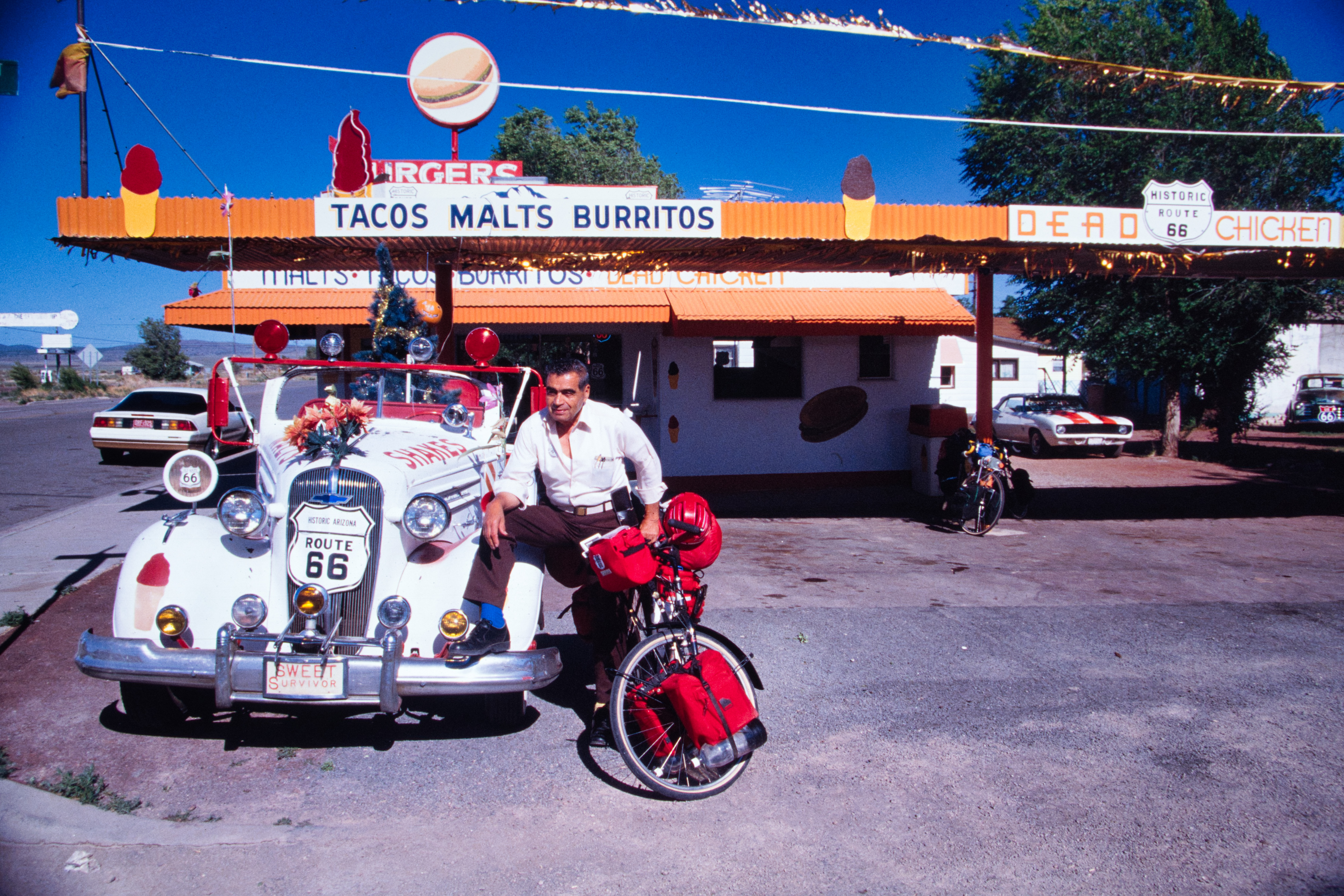
1990 picture of Juan Delgadillo with his 1936 Chevrolet in front of the restaurant

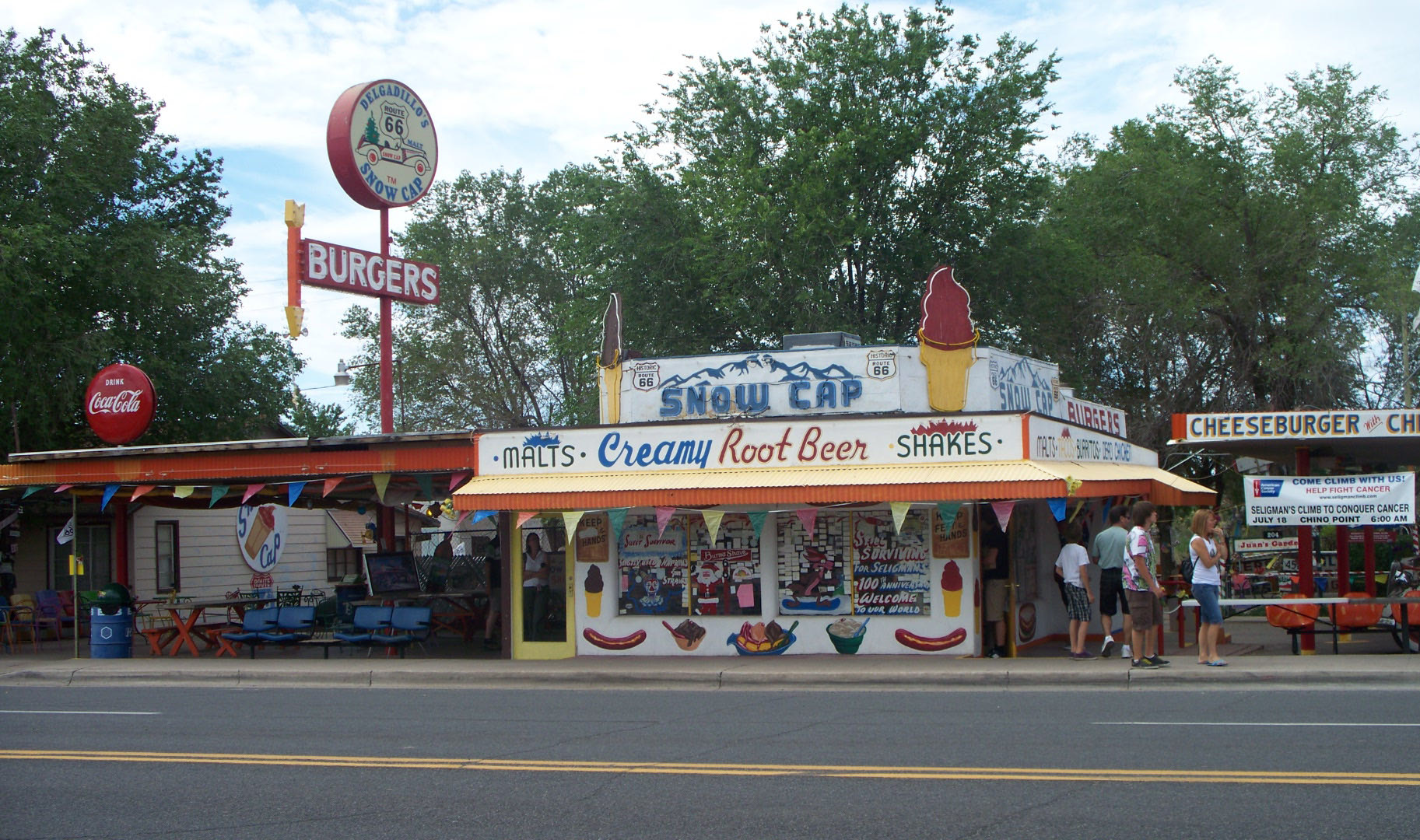
2009 view of Delgadillo's Snow Cap Drive-In

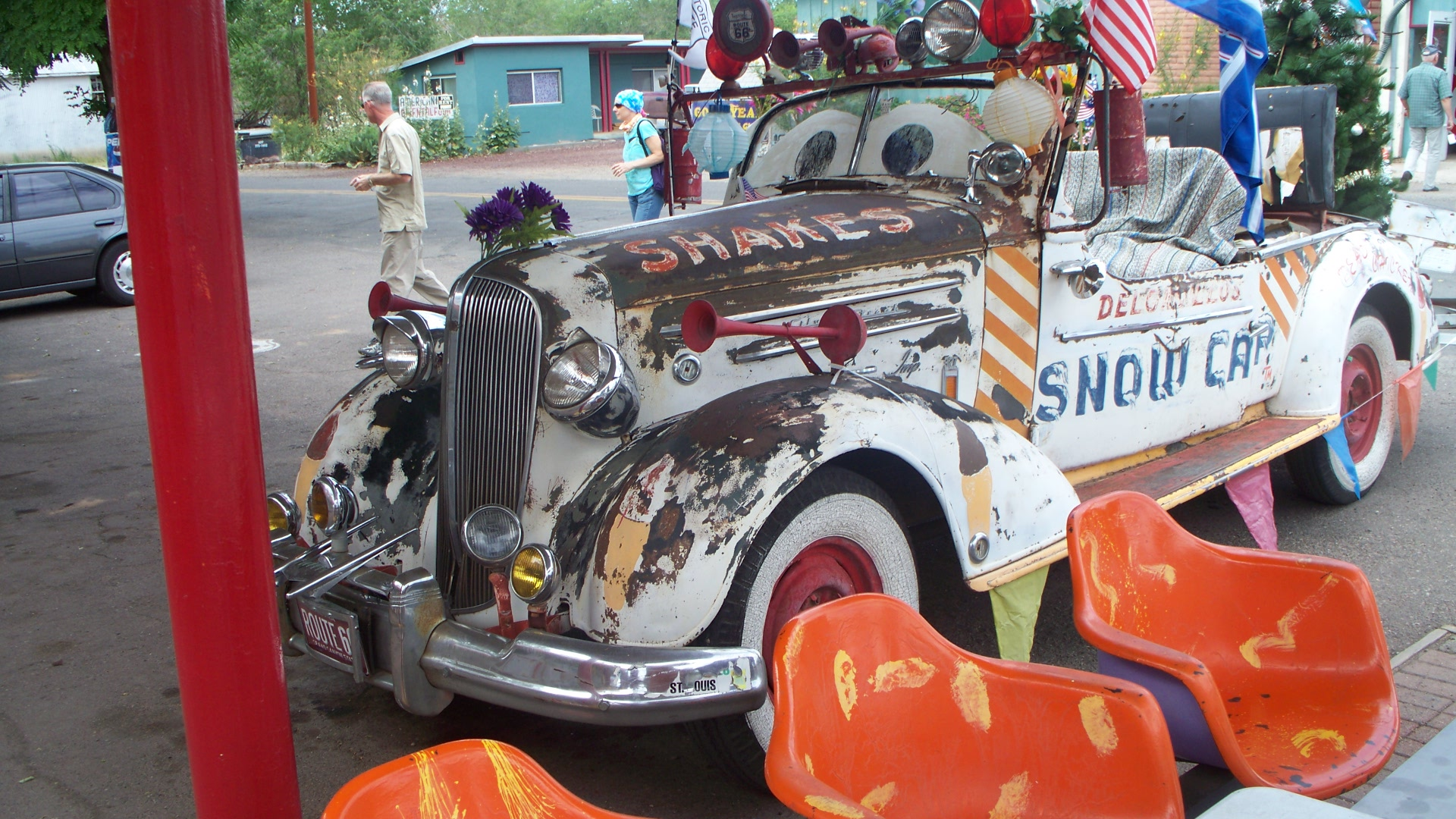
Juan Delgadillo's 1936 Chevrolet, on permanent display in front of the restaurant

Delgadillo's Snow Cap Drive-In is a historic eatery and roadside attraction located along Route 66 in Seligman, Arizona USA. The drive-in was built in 1953 by local resident Juan Delgadillo (1916–2004). Delgadillo was working on an extremely limited budget, so he built the restaurant mostly from scrap lumber obtained from the nearby Santa Fe Railway yard.

To bring attention to the restaurant, Delgadillo sliced the roof off of a 1936 Chevrolet hardtop, adorned the automobile with paint, horns and various automotive emblems and even an artificial Christmas tree in the rear of the car.

Delgadillo's flair for showmanship extended to his menu, which still features such choices as a "cheeseburger with cheese" and "dead chicken". His sense of humor is evident in "Juan's Garden" at the rear of the property with its collection of old automobiles and kitsch in general; the humorous approach extends to the building. Hand-painted signs in the parking area warn drivers that they are parking at their own risk. A neon sign in the window informs patrons, "Sorry, we're open". The door that leads to the counter has two knobs, one on the right and one on the left. The knob on the right is a dummy; the one on the left actually opens the door. Delgadillo would continue his humorous approach by bantering with his patrons over their choices of food, asking, for example, if they wanted cheese on their cheeseburgers.

While researching the history of Route 66 for the 2006 Pixar motion picture Cars, John Lasseter met Delgadillo's brother, Seligman barber and Route 66 historian, Angel Delgadillo, who told him how traffic through the town virtually disappeared on the day that nearby Interstate 40 opened. Both brothers are acknowledged in the film's credits.

The restaurant is located within the Seligman Commercial Historic District, and is cited as one of the town's flamboyant examples of roadside architecture.

Since Juan Delgadillo's death in 2004, the Snow Cap Drive-In has been run by his daughter Cecilia and son John, working the counter in the same playful manner. The walls around the counter area are covered with business cards from all over the world.

Author Michael Wallis covers the history of the Snow Cap Drive-In in his book, Route 66: The Mother Road.

On a January 11, 2012 episode of the History Channel's American Restoration show, Angel asked the host to restore his nephews' old Wurlitzer jukebox from the 1950s to full working order, which he did.

Juan Delgadillo and his restaurant are also featured in the 2019 movie Wish Man.

== Gallery ==
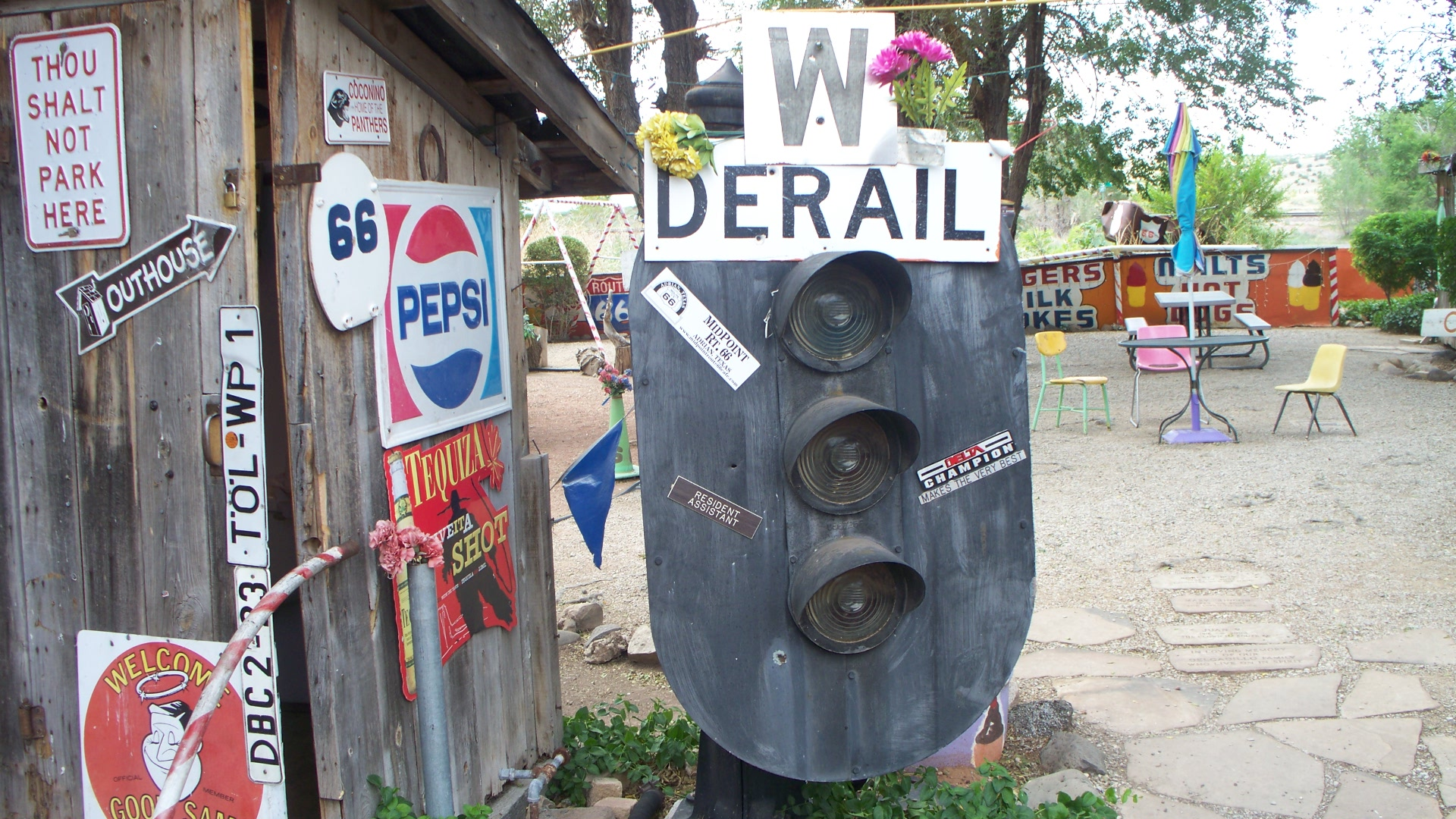
Old railroad block signal on display in the garden at the rear of the restaurant

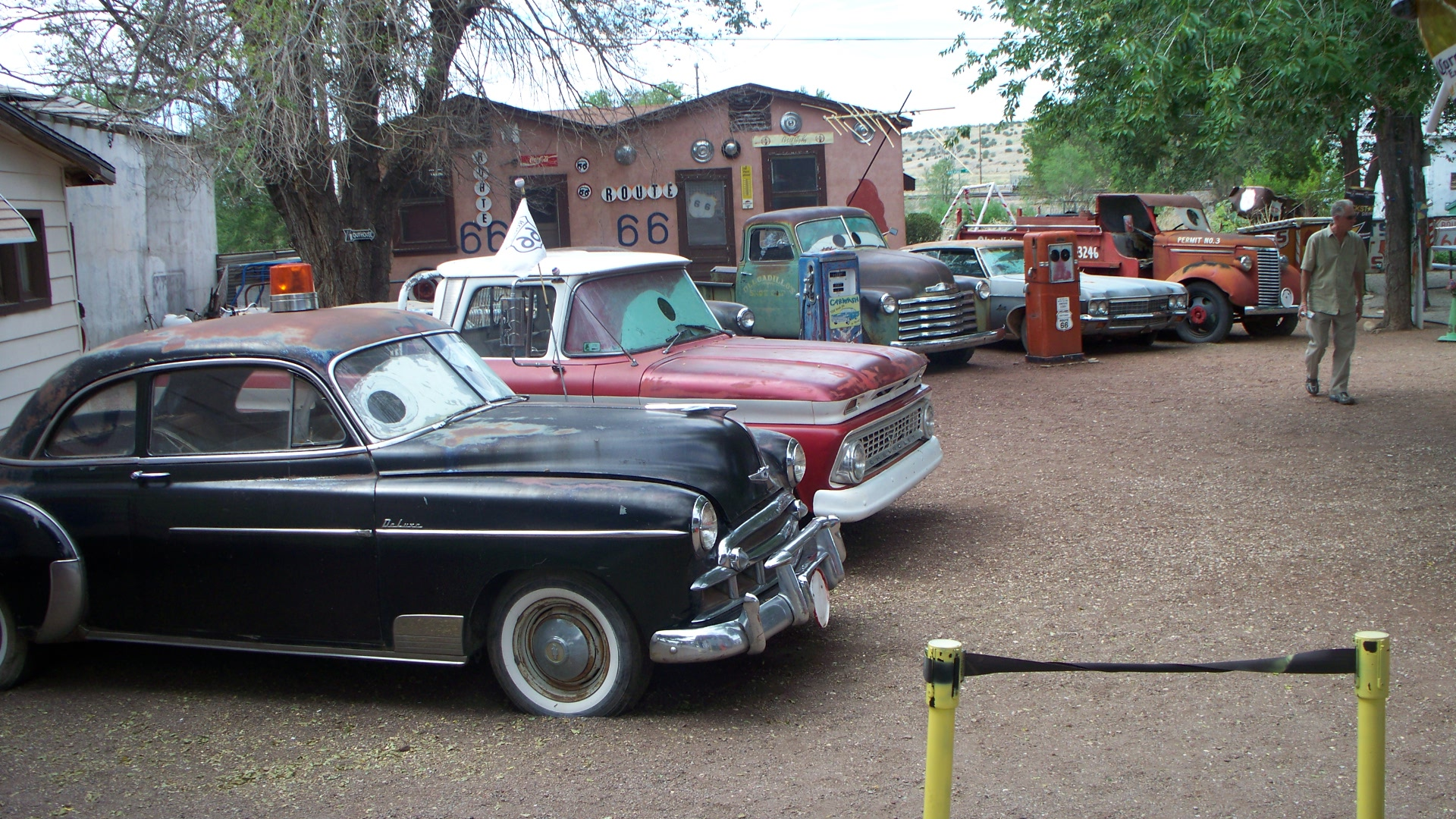
Juan Delgadillo's collection of vintage Chevrolets. Pictured l to r: 1949 Deluxe coupe, 1963 half-ton pickup, unidentified fender, 1950 half-ton pickup, 1970 Impala hardtop, 1939 one-ton fire truck

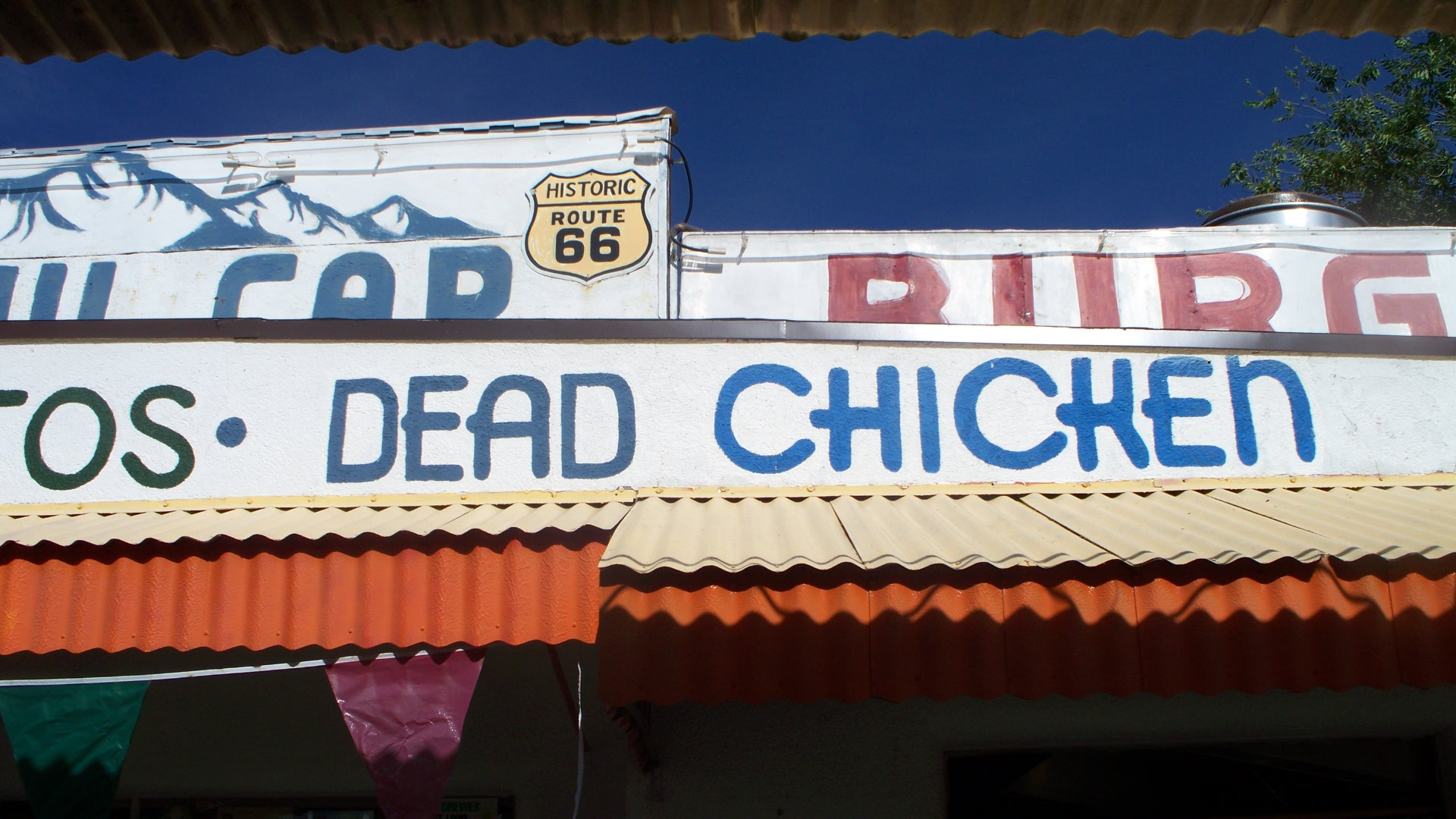
Sign along the roof advertising the "Dead Chicken" menu item

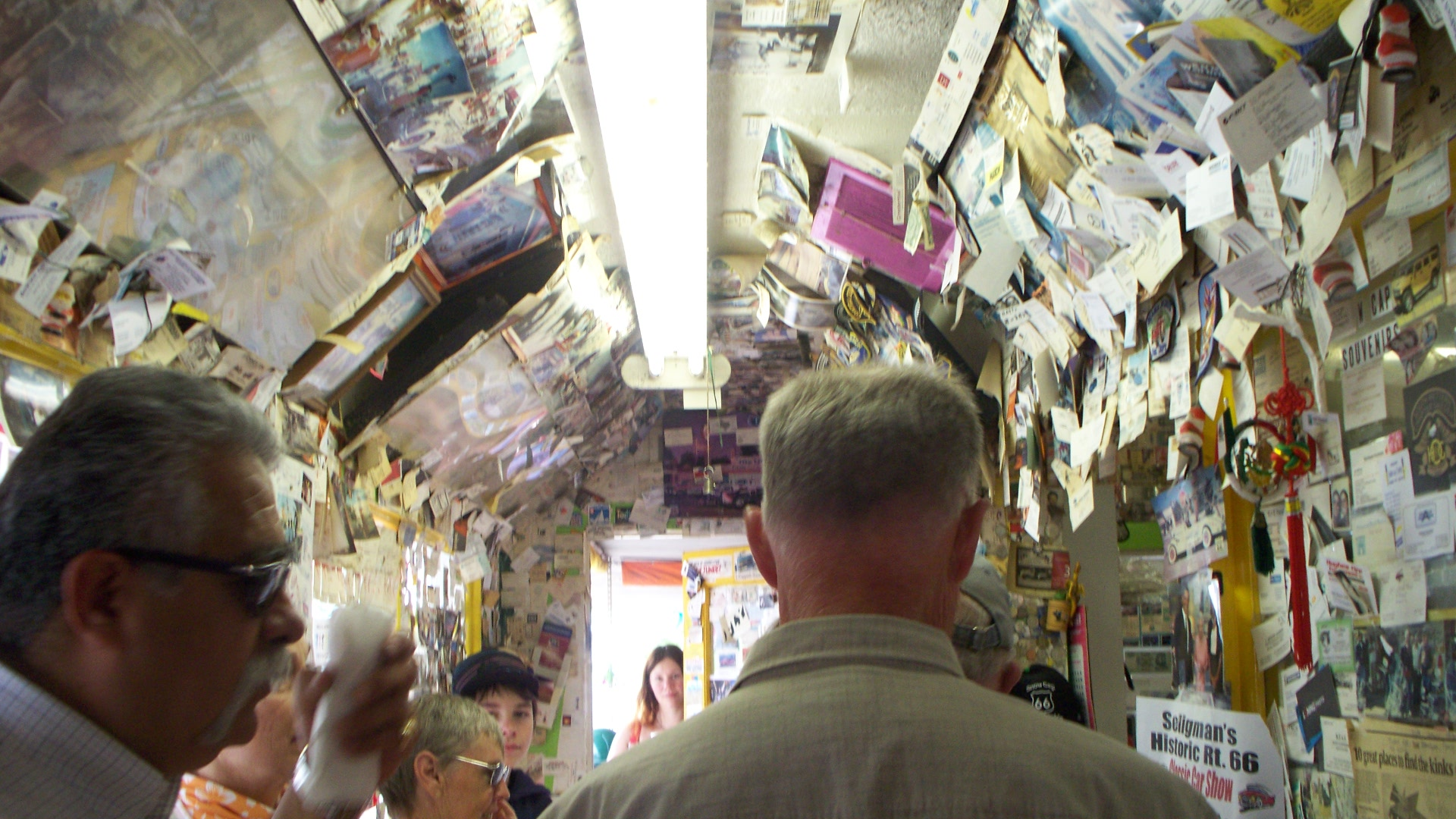
Interior of the Snow Cap with its thousands of business cards adorning the walls. Order window is to the right

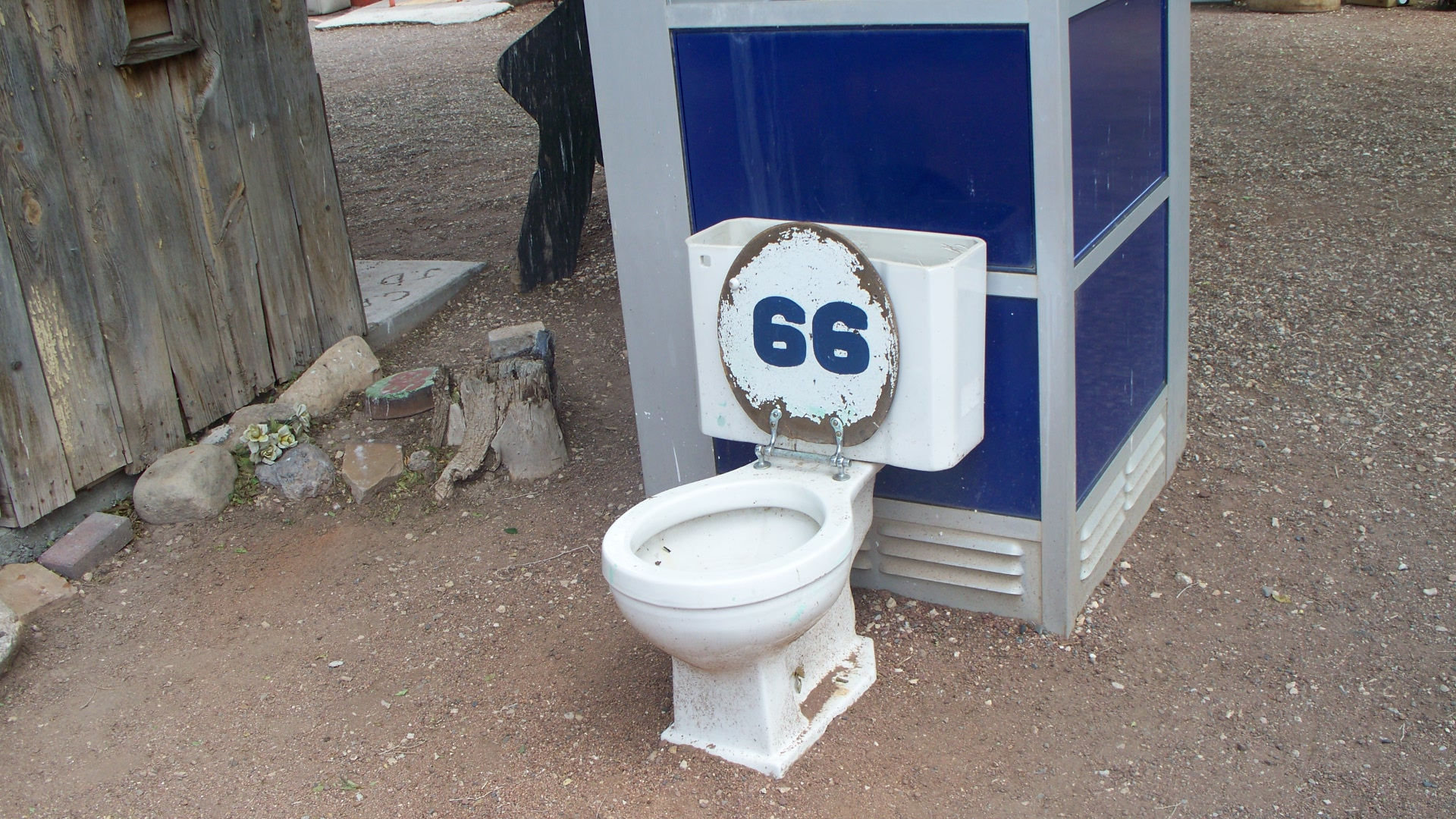
Toilet and phone booth displayed for humorous effect in the garden

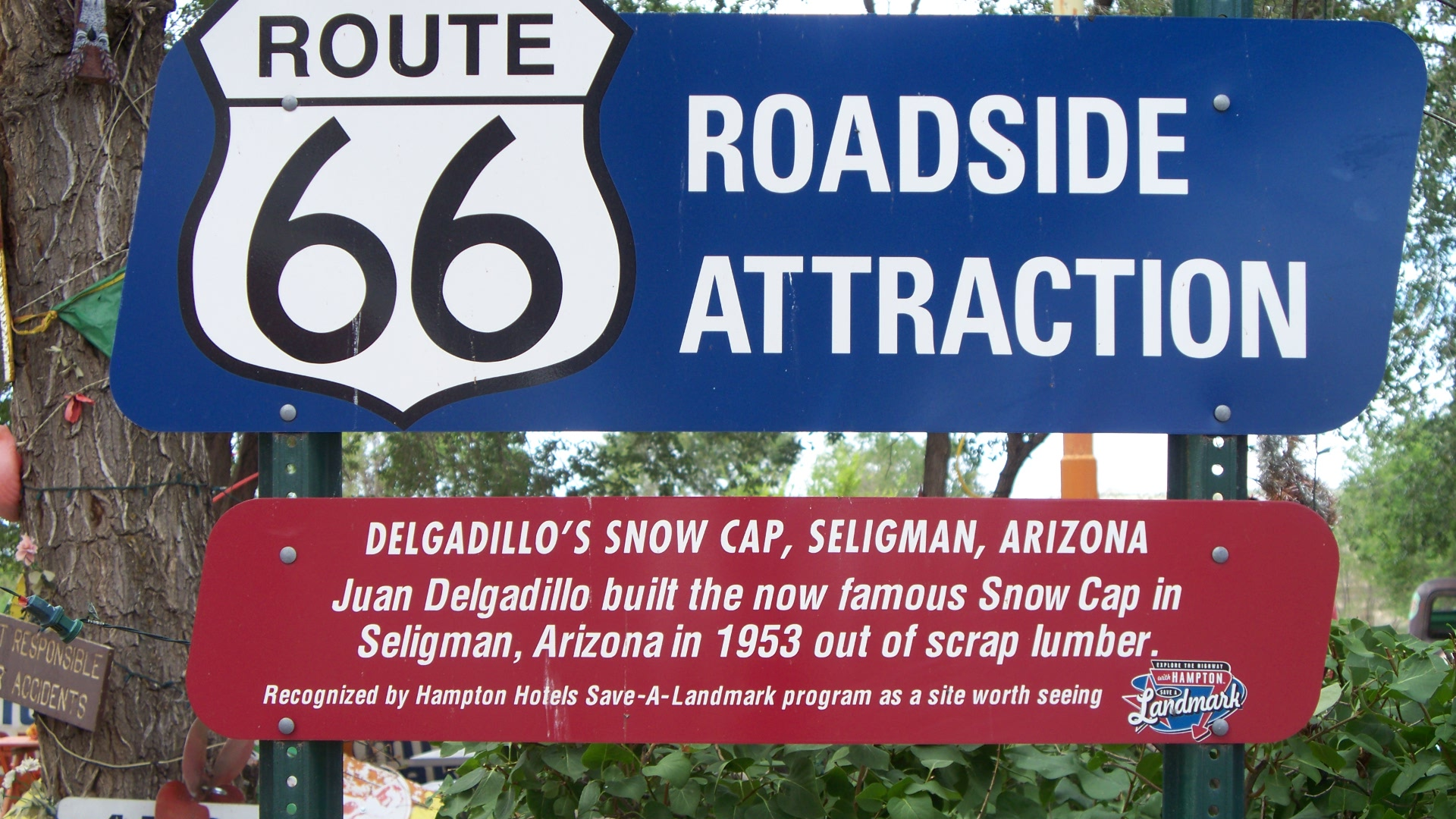
"Must-see" marker placed by Hampton Hotels
