= 1987 Detroit Lions season =

NFL team season

- Owner: William Clay Ford Sr.
- General manager: Russ Thomas
- Head coach: Darryl Rogers
- Home stadium: Pontiac Silverdome

Results
- Record: 4–11
- Division place: 5th NFC Central
- Playoffs: Did not qualify

The 1987 Detroit Lions season was the 58th season in franchise history. In a strike-affected season, the Lions fell one game further from their 1986 record of 5–11, winning only four games and missing the postseason for the fourth consecutive season. Their week 3 game against long-time rival Chicago was the game affected by the strike, and as a result the Bears and Lions only met once during the season, the only season during the rivalry that the teams haven't met twice in a season. Highlights of their Nov. 22 loss in Chicago were later shown during the Max Headroom signal hijacking that occurred across the city of Chicago that night.

== Offseason ==
=== NFL draft ===
1987 Detroit Lions draft
Round	Pick	Player	Position	College	Notes
1	7	Reggie Rogers	Defensive end	Washington	
3	63	Jerry Ball *	Nose tackle	SMU	
4	92	Garland Rivers	Defensive back	Michigan	
6	148	Danny Lockett	Linebacker	Arizona	
7	175	Dan Saleaumua *	Defensive tackle	Arizona State	
8	203	Dennis Gibson	Linebacker	Iowa State	
9	230	Rick Calhoun	Running back	Fullerton	
10	259	Raynard Brown	Wide receiver	South Carolina	
11	286	Brian Siverling	Tight end	Penn State	
12	315	Gary Lee	Wide receiver	Georgia Tech	
Made roster * Made at least one Pro Bowl during career

=== Undrafted free agents ===
1987 undrafted free agents of note
Player	Position	College
Karl Bernard	Running back	Southwestern Louisiana
Lee Saltz	Quarterback	Temple

== Personnel ==
=== Staff / Coaches ===
1987 Detroit Lions staff
Front office: Owner and president – William Clay Ford Sr.; Executive vice president and general manager – Russ Thomas; Treasurer – William Clay Ford Jr.; Controller – Chuck Schmidt; General counsel – Jerry Vainisi; Director of player personnel – Joe Bushofsky; Pro scouting – Ron Hughes; Head coaches: Head coach and director of football operations – Darryl Rogers; Offensive coaches: Offensive coordinator/quarterbacks – Bob Baker; Running backs – Vic Rapp; Receivers – Lew Carpenter; Tight ends/staff administrative assistant – Don Doll; Offensive line – Bill Muir	Defensive coaches: Defensive coordinator – Wayne Fontes; Defensive line – Rex Norris; Linebackers – Mike Murphy; Defensive backs – Willie Shaw; Special teams coaches: Special teams – Carl Battershell; Strength and conditioning: Strength and conditioning coordinator – Don Clemons

=== NFL replacement players ===
After the league decided to use replacement players during the NFLPA strike, the following team was assembled:

1987 Detroit Lions replacement roster
Quarterbacks: 10 Brendan Folmar; 18 Todd Hons; Running backs: 28 Calvin Farmer; 30 Nick Kowgios; 31 Cleve Wester; 36 Davey Lewis; 24 Gary Ellerson; 44 Tony Dollinger; 46 Stan Edwards FB; 86 Danny Bradley WR/KR; Wide receivers: 45 Eric Truvillion; 80 Darrell Grymes; 81 Stan Baker; 83 Melvin Hoover; 87 Gilvanni Johnson; 89 James Duncan; Tight ends: 81 Mark Witte; 82 Mark Wheeler; 84 Jerry Diorio; 84 Tim Schramm	Offensive linemen: 60 Chuck Steele; 63 Joe Felton; 64 Paul Kiser; 65 Patrick Cain; 67 Greg Orton; 68 Jerry Quaerna; 71 Chris Geile; 72 Jim Warne; 76 Mark Jenkins; 76 Mark Fincher; 77 Rick Johnson; Defensive linemen: 69 Charles Benson; 73 Jeff Kacmarek; 79 William Gay; 97 George McDuffie; 98 Jerome Davis; 99 Bob Beemer; 99 Stuart Tolle	Linebackers: 34 Creig Federico; 50 Ernie Adams; 50 Danny Lockett; 54 Thomas Boyd; 58 Carl Carr; 90 Robert Thompson; 93 Tim Ross; 95 Steve Boadway; 98 John Wacker; Defensive backs: 21 Bob McDonough CB/S; 23 Kevin Grom; 23 Maurice Harvey LCB; 25 Anthony Fields; 35 Alvin Hall CB/KR; 39 Ken Luckett; 39 John Bostic; 43 Ivan Hicks; 53 Anthony Office; 47 Steve Hirsch; Special teams: 1 Matt Kinzer P; 11 Mike Black P; 13 Mike Mancini P; 14 John Misko P; 19 Mike Prindle K

=== Roster ===
1987 Detroit Lions roster
Quarterbacks (QB): 12 Joe Ferguson; 16 Chuck Long; Running backs (RB): 25 Karl Bernard; 42 Gary Ellerson; 32 Garry James; 30 James Jones; 49 Tony Paige; 21 Butch Woolfolk; Wide receivers (WR): 80 Carl Bland; 88 Raynard Brown; 83 Gary Lee; 82 Pete Mandley; 86 Mark Nichols; Tight ends (TE): 87 Vyto Kab; 81 Mark Lewis; 84 Rob Rubick	Offensive linemen (OL): 68 Steve Baack G; 61 Scott Barrows G; 75 Lomas Brown T; 53 Kevin Glover G/C; 74 Joe Milinichik T; 52 Steve Mott C; 73 Harvey Salem T; 64 Eric Sanders T; Defensive linemen (DL): 93 Jerry Ball NT; 77 Keith Ferguson DE; 79 William Gay DE; 62 Curtis Green DE; 60 Reggie Rogers DE; 97 Dan Saleaumua NT; 76 Eric Williams DE	Linebackers (LB): 96 Paul Butcher ILB; 55 Mike Cofer OLB; 98 Dennis Gibson ILB; 95 George Jamison OLB; 50 Danny Lockett ILB; 57 Vernon Maxwell OLB; 56 Shelton Robinson ILB; 59 Jimmy Williams OLB; Defensive backs (DB): 45 Raphel Cherry FS; 23 Kenny Daniel FS; 40 Duane Galloway CB; 34 James Griffin SS; 29 Bruce McNorton CB; 28 Chris Sheffield CB; 41 Ricky Smith CB; 44 Ivory Sully SS; 27 Bobby Watkins CB; Special teams (ST): 6 Jim Arnold P; 3 Eddie Murray K	Practice squad: None - Vacant; Reserve: 54 Tom Boyd LB (IR); 89 Jeff Chadwick WR (IR); 78 Bob Cryder T (IR); -- Dave D'Addio RB (IR); 70 Keith Dorney G (IR); 15 Russell Erxleben P (IR); 66 Leon Evans DE (IR); 17 Eric Hipple QB (IR); -- Ron Kosar T (IR); 31 Devon Mitchell S (IR); -- Lee Saltz QB (IR); -- Don Snyder T (IR); 71 Rich Strenger T (IR); 38 Scott Williams RB (IR); Rookies in italics 50 active, 14 reserve, 0 practice squad

== Regular season ==
=== Schedule ===
Week	Date	Opponent	Result	Record	Attendance
1	September 13	at **Minnesota Vikings**	**L** 34–19	0—1	57,061
2	September 20	at Los Angeles Raiders	**L** 27–7	0—2	50,300
–	September 27	Chicago Bears	canceled due to strike		
3	October 4	**Tampa Bay Buccaneers**	**L** 31–27	0—3	4,919
4	October 11	at **Green Bay Packers**	**W** 19–16 _{OT}	1—3	35,779
5	October 18	Seattle Seahawks	**L** 37–14	1—4	8,310
6	October 25	**Green Bay Packers**	**L** 34–33	1—5	27,278
7	November 1	at Denver Broncos	**L** 34–0	1—6	75,172
8	November 8	Dallas Cowboys	**W** 27–17	2—6	45,325
9	November 15	at Washington Redskins	**L** 20–13	2—7	53,593
10	November 22	at **Chicago Bears**	**L** 30–10	2—8	63,357
11	November 26	Kansas City Chiefs	**L** 27–20	2—9	43,820
12	December 6	Los Angeles Rams	**L** 37–16	2—10	33,413
13	December 13	at **Tampa Bay Buccaneers**	**W** 20–10	3—10	41,699
14	December 20	**Minnesota Vikings**	**L** 17–14	4—10	27,693
15	December 27	at Atlanta Falcons	**W** 30–13	4—11	13,906
Note: Intra-divisional opponents are in **bold** text.

=== Standings ===
NFC Central
	W	L	T	PCT	DIV	CONF	PF	PA	STK
Chicago Bears^{(2)}	11	4	0	.733	7–0	9–2	356	282	W1
Minnesota Vikings^{(5)}	8	7	0	.533	3–5	6–6	336	335	L1
Green Bay Packers	5	9	1	.367	3–4	4–7	255	300	L2
Tampa Bay Buccaneers	4	11	0	.267	3–4	4–9	286	360	L8
Detroit Lions	4	11	0	.267	2–5	4–7	269	384	W1
