= 1988 Detroit Lions season =

NFL team season

- Owner: William Clay Ford Sr.
- General manager: Russ Thomas
- Head coach: Darryl Rogers (fired November 13, 2-9 record); Wayne Fontes (interim, 2-4 record)
- Home stadium: Pontiac Silverdome

Results
- Record: 4–12
- Division place: 4th NFC Central
- Playoffs: Did not qualify
- All-Pros: P Jim Arnold (2nd team)
- Pro Bowlers: LB Mike Cofer; P Jim Arnold

The 1988 Detroit Lions season was the 59th season in franchise history. The team fell a step further from their 4–11 record in the strike-affected 1987 season, losing 12 of 16 games and suffering their fifth successive losing record. Head coach Darryl Rogers, who had served since 1985, was fired after 11 games and replaced by defensive coordinator Wayne Fontes.

The 1988 Lions’ offense was historically inept; their 3,405 offensive yards gained is the second-lowest all-time in a 16-game season, and the lowest total of the 1980s. Their 220 points scored (13.75 per game) is the fifth-fewest of the 1980s. They scored 20 or more points only three times all season.

== Offseason ==
=== NFL draft ===
1988 Detroit Lions draft
Round	Pick	Player	Position	College	Notes
1	3	Bennie Blades *	S	Miami (FL)	
2	29	Chris Spielman *	LB	Ohio State	
2	32	Pat Carter	TE	Florida State	
3	58	Ray Roundtree	WR	Penn State	
4	85	William White	S	Ohio State	
5	111	Eric Andolsek	G	LSU	
6	142	Carl Painter	RB	Hampton	
7	169	Jeff James	WR	Stanford	
8	196	Gary Hadd	DT	Minnesota	
9	223	Kip Corrington	S	Texas A&M	
9	234	Todd Irvin	OT	Mississippi	
10	254	Paco Craig	WR	UCLA	
11	281	Danny McCoin	QB	Cincinnati	
Made roster * Made at least one Pro Bowl during career

=== Undrafted free agents ===
1988 undrafted free agents of note
Player	Position	College
Douglas Beaty	Fullback	Appalachian State

== Personnel ==
=== Staff ===
1988 Detroit Lions staff
Front office: Owner and president – William Clay Ford Sr.; Executive vice president and general manager – Russ Thomas; Treasurer – William Clay Ford Jr.; Vice president for finance – Chuck Schmidt; Vice president for player personnel – Jerry Vainisi; Director of player personnel – Joe Bushofsky; Director of pro scouting – Ron Hughes; Head coaches: Head coach and director of football operations – Darryl Rogers; Offensive coaches: Offensive coordinator/quarterbacks – Bob Baker; Running backs – Vic Rapp; Receivers – Lew Carpenter; Tight ends/staff administrative assistant – Don Doll; Offensive line – Bill Muir	Defensive coaches: Defensive coordinator/secondary – Wayne Fontes; Defensive line – Dick Modzelewski; Inside linebackers – Mike Murphy; Outside linebackers – Willie Shaw; Special teams coaches: Special teams – Carl Battershell; Strength and conditioning: Strength and conditioning coordinator – Don Clemons

=== Roster ===
1988 Detroit Lions roster
Quarterbacks (QB): 12 Rusty Hilger; 16 Chuck Long; Running backs (RB): 32 Garry James; 30 James Jones; 42 Randall Morris; 49 Tony Paige FB; 26 Carl Painter KR; 38 Scott Williams; Wide receivers (WR): 80 Carl Bland KR; 89 Jeff Chadwick; 83 Gary Lee KR; 82 Pete Mandley PR; 81 Stephen Starring KR; Tight ends (TE): 87 Pat Carter; 84 Rob Rubick	Offensive linemen (OL): 65 Eric Andolsek G; 61 Scott Barrows G; 75 Lomas Brown T; 53 Kevin Glover G; 74 Joe Milinichik G; 52 Steve Mott C; 73 Harvey Salem T; 64 Eric Sanders T; 72 Curt Singer T; Defensive linemen (DL): 93 Jerry Ball NT; 77 Keith Ferguson DE; 71 Gary Hadd DE; 97 Dan Saleaumua NT; 94 Thomas Strauthers DE; 76 Eric Williams DE	Linebackers (LB): 57 Dave Ahrens OLB; 96 Paul Butcher OLB; 55 Mike Cofer OLB; 98 Dennis Gibson ILB; 58 George Jamison OLB; 50 Danny Lockett ILB; 54 Chris Spielman ILB; Defensive backs (DB): 36 Bennie Blades SS; 45 Raphel Cherry FS; 34 James Griffin S; 43 Jerry Holmes CB; 29 Bruce McNorton CB; 31 Devon Mitchell FS; 27 Bobby Watkins CB; 35 William White CB; Special teams (ST): 3 Eddie Murray K; 6 Jim Arnold P	Practice squad 47 active, 11 inactive Reserve: 68 Steve Baack NT (IR); 25 Karl Bernard RB (IR); 40 Duane Galloway CB (IR); 62 Curtis Green (IR); 17 Eric Hipple QB (IR); 14 Danny McCoin QB (IR); 56 Shelton Robinson LB (IR); 60 Reggie Rogers DE (IR); 86 Ray Roundtree WR (IR); 59 Jimmy Williams LB (IR); 21 Butch Woolfolk RB (IR); Rookies in italics

== Regular season ==
=== Schedule ===
Week	Date	Opponent	Result	Record	Attendance
1	September 4	Atlanta Falcons	**W** 31–17	1–0	31,075
2	September 11	at Los Angeles Rams	**L** 10–17	1–1	46,262
3	September 18	New Orleans Saints	**L** 14–22	1–2	32,943
4	September 25	New York Jets	**L** 10–17	1–3	29,250
5	October 2	at San Francisco 49ers	**L** 13–20	1–4	58,285
6	October 9	**Chicago Bears**	**L** 7–24	1–5	64,526
7	October 16	at New York Giants	**L** 10–30	1–6	74,813
8	October 23	at Kansas City Chiefs	**W** 7–6	2–6	66,926
9	October 30	New York Giants	**L** 10–13 _{OT}	2–7	38,354
10	November 6	at **Minnesota Vikings**	**L** 17–44	2–8	55,573
11	November 13	**Tampa Bay Buccaneers**	**L** 20–23	2–9	25,956
12	November 20	at **Green Bay Packers**	**W** 19–9	3–9	44,327
13	November 24	**Minnesota Vikings**	**L** 0–23	3–10	46,379
14	December 4	**Green Bay Packers**	**W** 30–14	4–10	28,124
15	December 11	at **Chicago Bears**	**L** 12–13	4–11	55,010
16	December 18	at **Tampa Bay Buccaneers**	**L** 10–21	4–12	37,778
Note: Intra-divisional opponents are in **bold** text.

=== Game summaries ===
==== Week 1 ====
Team	1	2	3	4	Total
Falcons	3	0	0	14	17
• **Lions**	0	10	14	7	31

- Date: September 4
- Location: Pontiac Silverdome, Pontiac, Michigan
- Game start: 1:00 p.m.
- Game weather: indoors (dome)

Scoring summary
1	ATL	Greg Davis 19 yard field goal	Falcons 3–0
2	DET	Pete Mandley 7 yard pass from Chuck Long (Eddie Murray kick)	Lions 7–3
2	DET	Eddie Murray 37 yard field goal	Lions 10–3
3	DET	Garry James 1 yard run (Eddie Murray kick)	Lions 17–3
3	DET	George Jamison 4 yard fumble return (Eddie Murray kick)	Lions 24–3
4	ATL	Alex Higdon 9 yard pass from Chris Miller (Greg Davis kick)	Lions 24–10
4	DET	Mark Lewis 1 yard pass from Chuck Long (Eddie Murray kick)	Lions 31–10
4	ATL	John Settle 2 yard run (Greg Davis kick)	Lions 31–17

==== Week 8 ====
Team	1	2	3	4	Total
• Lions	0	7	0	0	7
Chiefs	0	3	3	0	6

- Date: October 23
- Location: Arrowhead Stadium, Kansas City, MO
- Game start: 1:00 p.m. EST
- Game weather: 58 °F or 14.4 °C; wind 20 miles per hour (32 km/h; 17 kn)

Scoring summary
Q2	KC	Lowery 38 yard field goal	KC 3–0
Q2	DET	Chadwick 14 yard pass from Hilger (Murray kick)	DET 7–3
Q3	KC	Lowery 43 yard field goal	DET 7–6

==== Week 12 ====
Team	1	2	3	4	Total
• Lions	3	6	0	10	19
Packers	0	0	3	6	9

- Date: November 20
- Location: Milwaukee County Stadium, Milwaukee, WI
- Game start: 1:00 p.m.
- Game weather: 38 °F or 3.3 °C; wind 13 miles per hour (21 km/h; 11 kn)

Scoring summary
Q1	DET	Murray 42 yard field goal	DET 3–0
Q2	DET	Murray 37 yard field goal	DET 6–0
Q2	DET	Murray 19 yard field goal	DET 9–0
Q3	GB	Dawson 32 yard field goal	DET 9–3
Q4	DET	Williams 1 yard run (Murray kick)	DET 16–3
Q4	DET	Murray 26 yard field goal	DET 19–3
Q4	GB	Matthews 3 yard pass from Majkowski (kick failed)	DET 19–9

==== Week 14 ====
Team	1	2	3	4	Total
Packers	0	0	0	14	14
• Lions	10	17	0	3	30

- Date: December 4
- Location: Pontiac Silverdome, Pontiac, MI
- Game start: 1:00 p.m.
- Game weather: Indoors (dome)

Scoring summary
Q1	DET	Murray 26 yard field goal	DET 3–0
Q1	DET	Mandley 21 yard run (Murray kick)	DET 10–0
Q2	DET	Murray 23 yard field goal	DET 13–0
Q2	DET	Mitchell 90 yard interception return (Murray kick)	DET 20–0
Q2	DET	James 2 yard run (Murray kick)	DET 27–0
Q4	GB	West 4 yard pass from Wright (Dorsey kick)	DET 27–7
Q4	DET	Murray 23 yard field goal	DET 30–7
Q4	GB	Sharpe 24 yard pass from Wright (Dorsey kick)	DET 30–14

=== Standings ===
NFC Central
	W	L	T	PCT	DIV	CONF	PF	PA	STK
Chicago Bears^{(1)}	12	4	0	.750	6–2	9–3	312	215	L1
Minnesota Vikings^{(4)}	11	5	0	.688	6–2	9–3	406	233	W1
Tampa Bay Buccaneers	5	11	0	.313	4–4	4–8	261	350	W1
Detroit Lions	4	12	0	.250	2–6	3–11	220	315	L2
Green Bay Packers	4	12	0	.250	2–6	3–9	240	313	W2
