= Monkton House, West Dean =

Monkton House
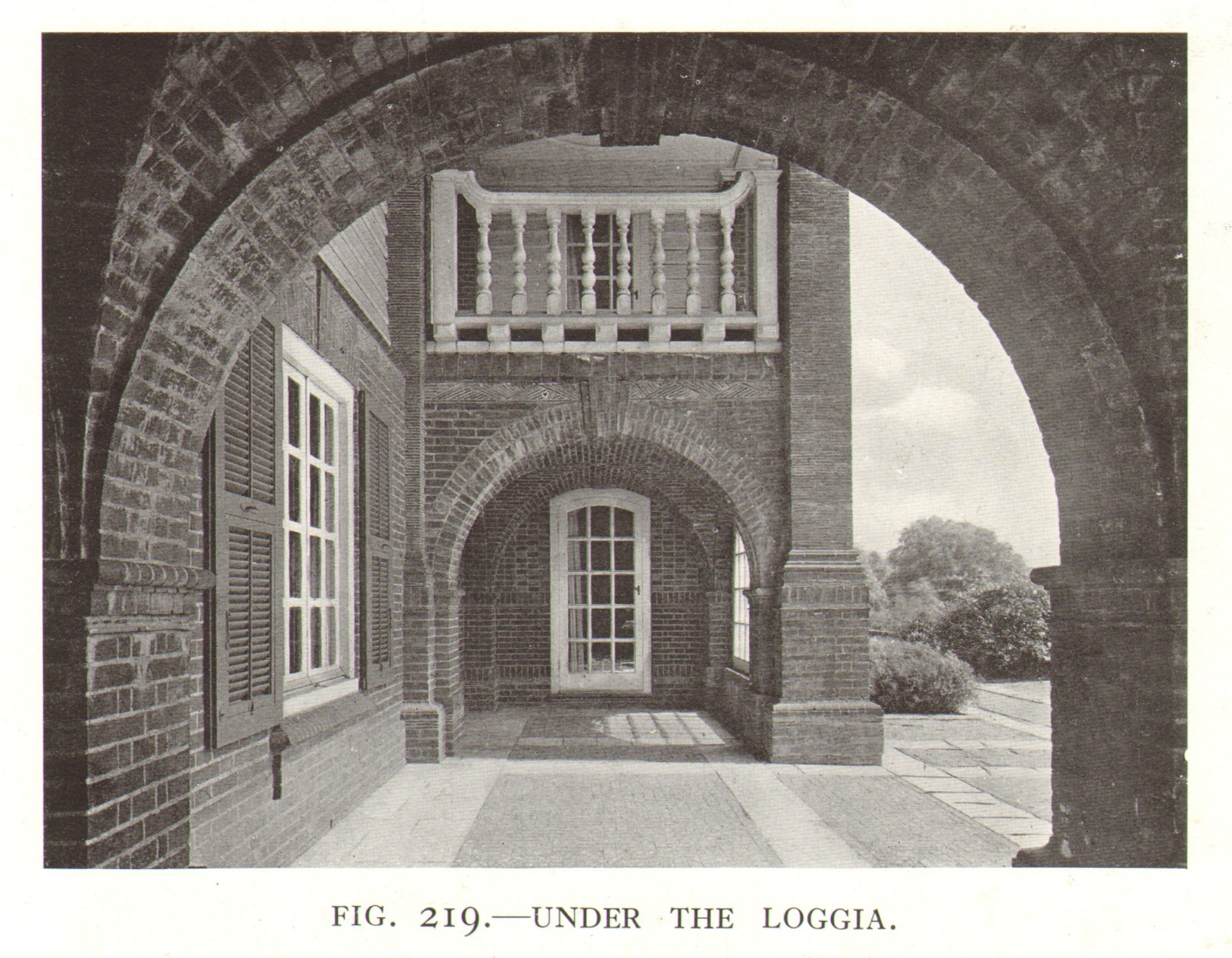
- "the only complete Surrealist house ever created in Britain"

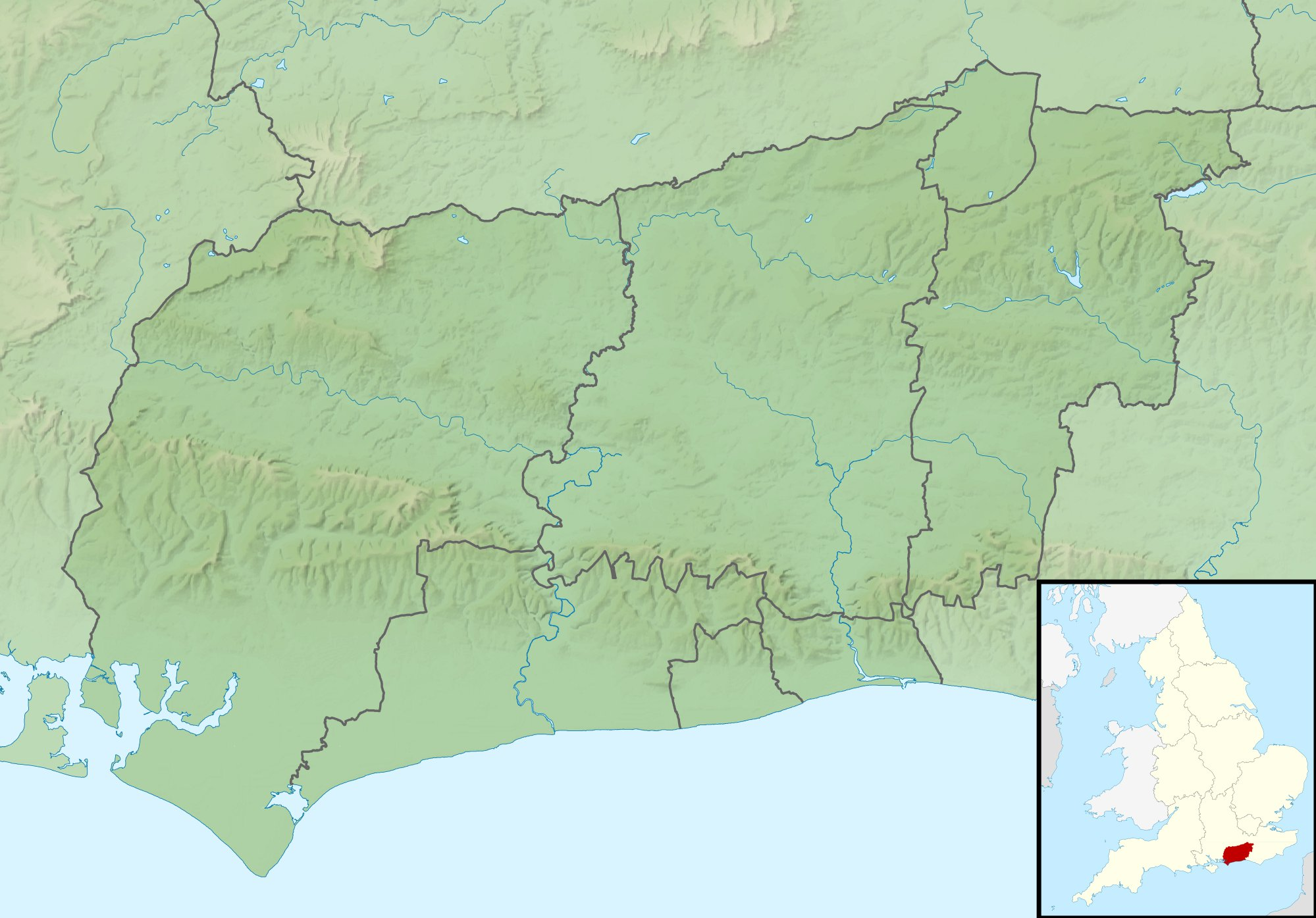
- Location within West Sussex
- 50°57′00″N 0°49′09″W
- Type: House
- Location: West Dean, West Sussex

History
- Built: 1902-03. Surrealist remodelling c. 1930 by Christopher Nicholson, Hugh Casson and Salvador Dalí for Edward James

Site notes
- Architect: Edwin Lutyens
- Governing body: Privately owned

Listed Building – Grade II
- Official name: Monkton House
- Designated: 20 September 1985
- Reference no.: 1026127

Monkton House, West Dean, West Sussex is an English country house designed in 1902 by Edwin Lutyens for William Dodge James. It was extensively remodelled for his son, Edward James, in the 1930s. Working with Christopher Nicholson and Hugh Casson, and assisted by Salvador Dalí, James constructed what has been called "the only complete Surrealist house ever created in Britain". The collection of Surrealist art and furniture which James assembled at the house, much of it by Dalí himself, was "one of the largest and most important in the world". A private residence, Monkton is a Grade II listed building.

== History ==
William Dodge James (1854–1912) was the third son of Daniel James (1801–1876), an American-born businessman who had made his fortune as a founder of the trading firm Phelps Dodge and moved to Liverpool to manage the English end of the firm's operations. Willie eschewed a business career, and following a youth spent travelling, established himself as a country gentleman, purchasing the West Dean estate in 1891. In 1902 he commissioned Edwin Lutyens to design Monkton House as a shooting lodge. The house acted as a trianon to the larger property. (Note: Edward James later planned his own trianon in the West Dean grounds. In the late 1930s, he acquired the façade of the London Pantheon, designed by James Wyatt in the 1770s, and asked Christopher Nicholson to design a pavilion incorporating the façade. The outbreak of war ended the endeavour, and the Pantheon elements were subsequently destroyed. However, Historic England suggests that the palm trees added to the Monkton House façade may have originally been part of the Pantheon's structure.) James' wife, Mrs Willie James was a noted Edwardian hostess and the Prince of Wales was a regular visitor. (Note: Edward VII is reputed to have stayed at West Dean from 1898, after his usual host for the Goodwood Races, Charles Gordon-Lennox, 6th Duke of Richmond had declined to receive Alice Keppel, Edward's mistress, at Goodwood House.)

Willie James died in 1912, and was succeeded by his son Edward, then a boy of five. Marrying, and subsequently divorcing, the dancer Tilly Losch, the bisexual James' greatest passion was Surrealism. An early supporter of Salvador Dalí, he engaged Christopher Nicholson and Hugh Casson to redesign Monkton and employed Dalí to decorate the interiors. Designed in extreme reaction to Lutyens' "cottage-y" style, Monkton has been described as "the only complete Surrealist house ever created in Britain". James stopped living at Monkton in the 1930s, returning for only brief visits, and the interior was left largely untouched. In later years James used the house to store the contents of other houses he had acquired.

James established the Edward James Foundation in 1964 and founded West Dean College in 1971. The college teaches courses in historic crafts and preservation. James sold some of his surrealist paintings to fund the college. (Note: James sometimes expressed resentment at the level of funding the college required, and the uses to which his money was put; "I didn’t give away my inheritance so that a middle-class couple, bored of watching television, could spend a weekend learning to make corn dollies for less than it would cost them to stay at a hotel in Torquay".) On James' death in 1984, Monkton House passed to the Edward James Foundation.

=== Sale ===
In 1986 the foundation announced it intended to sell the house and its contents. The foundation’s trustees insisted that the sale was financially necessary, Christopher Gibbs saying that they "[couldn't] go into an open ended liability running a museum of surrealism". A campaign, 'The Monkton Appeal', was launched by The Thirties Society and Save Britain's Heritage to purchase both for the nation, with the aim of raising £1.6 million (equivalent to £4,778,951 in 2025) by June 1986. The two groups secured a commitment from English Heritage to run the house and open it to the public if £650,000 could be found for the house and an additional £950,000 to purchase its contents. The chairman of English Heritage, Lord Montagu of Beaulieu, said that he was prepared for his body to run the house at an estimated cost of £50,000 a year provided the £1.6 million purchase cost had already been raised. In April the National Heritage Memorial Fund declined to make any contribution to the purchase price. This was a major blow to the campaign, which had expected the fund to assist them. The fund's director, Brian Lang, considered that the public benefit gained from saving Monkton was "a bit marginal".

Some of the leading architectural historians of the day, including Clive Aslet, Mark Girouard, and Gavin Stamp, strongly disagreed and vocally opposed the sale. Girouard described the creation of the house as "a dream expressed in three dimensions". Aslet said that it was difficult for outside organisations to raise the money to buy the house and its contents as the sale had been "pushed so quickly" by the foundation. Stamp mourned the loss: "had this ensemble not been broken up, Britain could now boast the finest collection of Surrealist art in the world". The architect Hugh Casson, who had worked on the house in the 1930s, was also opposed. Conversely, the architectural historian John Cornforth considered that Monkton did not merit saving and his views were perceived as particularly influential in the failure of the campaign. (Note: John Cornforth established his name by a series of books and articles on the English country house written in the 1960s and 1970s, and served as an advisor to the National Trust's Historic Buildings Committee, that determined which country houses the trust should accept. He acted in a similar capacity for the Historic Buildings Council for England. As such, his views on which buildings warranted saving and which did not were highly influential. Unfortunately for Monkton, as Cornforth’s obituarist noted, he "never much cared for Victorian houses and had a positive antipathy to Edward James' Surrealist reworking of Lutyens' Monkton House".)

A five-day auction of the contents of Monkton, described as "The Edward James Collection", was held by Christie's in June 1986 on the lawn of West Dean College. It raised £4,516,544 (equivalent to £13,490,214 in 2025). The prints, drawings and paintings raised almost £1 million. A 1936 painting by Max Ernst went for £64,800 despite having failed to sell at auction twice in previous years. The proceeds went to the endowment fund of West Dean College.

Monkton House itself was put on the market, with 66 acres of woodland and a cottage, for £750,000 in June 1986 (equivalent to £2,240,133 in 2025). It was bought by Simon Draper, the former chairman of Virgin Records. The house came with an aviary and James's collection of pheasants. Draper had unhappy memories of pheasants from his schooldays in South Africa, and asked the Edward James Foundation to take them away. The birds were re-homed at Beale Wildlife Park in Berkshire. Draper subsequently changed his mind and decided to re-establish the pheasant population at Monkton, and contacted the World Pheasant Association in Shepperton who assisted him with starting a breeding programme. In 1997 Draper's publishing company, Palawan Press, published The Atlas of Rare Pheasants in an edition of 48, illustrated by Timothy Greenwood.

Monkton was featured in Country Life magazine in their 12 September 1985 issue. The house was profiled by George Melly in Monkton – A Surrealist Dream, broadcast on Channel 4 in May 1986. The head gardener for 15 years was Ivan Hicks, who also worked with James on the creation of his gardens in Italy and Las Pozas in Mexico.

== Architecture and interior description ==
Monkton House has been listed Grade II on the National Heritage List for England since September 1985. Lutyens designed the building in brick, but during Edward James' renovations, this was rendered in purple stucco at the suggestion of Dalí. Of two storeys, with multiple balconies, the exterior exhibits a number of unusual, Dalí-esque features, such as the drain pipes which are supported by palm tree columns. An external clock at the house tells the days of the week and an external chimney is shaped like a tombstone. Moulded draperies resembling billowing, drying linen hang from the upper windows.

The interior decoration was ordered by James and Norris Wakefield. It was noted for its extensive use of textiles; the walls of the drawing room are covered with a quilted fabric. The Map Room featured a bed upholstered in blue silk, which was sold at auction at Phillips in April 2018. A glass panel in the centre of the ceiling of the map room was backlit with stars that were "positioned to represent the moment of James' birth". One bathroom was themed around fish. James's own bed was a replica of Napoleon's hearse. (Note: Other sources suggest Nelson's hearse as the inspiration.) A poem written and illustrated by James as an obituary for his friend Evelyn Waugh hung on the back staircase of the house. James's biographer Philip Purser described the cumulative effect as resembling "a mad potentate's private brothel".

The interior included many pieces by Dalí, in particular his Mae West Lips Sofa, (Note: One of the Mae West sofas fetched £725,000 at auction at Christie's in 2016, against an estimate of £250,000-400,000. Dalí produced five sofas in total, two pairs in red wool, one with black fringing, and a single in pink satin. The unfringed red pair and the single were designed for Wimpole Street, while the other red pair was placed in the dining room at Monkton House, either side of the Champagne Standard Lamps. The design has been much copied subsequently.) his Lobster Telephone and his Champagne Standard Lamps. (Note: The Department of Culture, Media and Sport placed an export ban on the Champagne Standard Lamps in an effort to prevent their being sold abroad.) Other pieces included the Drowning Hands Chair, (Note: The Drowning Hands, or Cat's Cradle, chair was reputedly inspired by Tilly Losch's Dance of the Hands, a performance piece she created in partnership with the actress Hedy Pfundmayer for the Salzburg Festival in 1927.) and the Pink Glove Tea Service. They were mainly commissioned from the designers Green & Abbott, who worked with Syrie Maugham on their realisation. A staircase carpet originally at the house was embroidered with the outline of the wet footprints made by Tilly Losch when she ran naked from a bathroom to her bedroom. Following their divorce, James moved the carpet to West Dean (where it remains), and replaced it with one embroidered with the footprints of his dog, whom James maintained had exhibited greater loyalty. (Note: Dalí's suggestion that the walls of the dining room at James' London house, 35 Wimpole Street, be covered in dog hair and designed to expand and contract, in imitation of a sick dog's stomach, was not taken forward.) The Victoria and Albert Museum, which ultimately acquired one of the pairs of lamps, and one of the Mae West Lips sofas, described James as a "key figure in the promotion and international recognition of Surrealism", and considered his collection, much of which was once held at Monkton, "one of the largest and most important in the world".

== Gallery ==
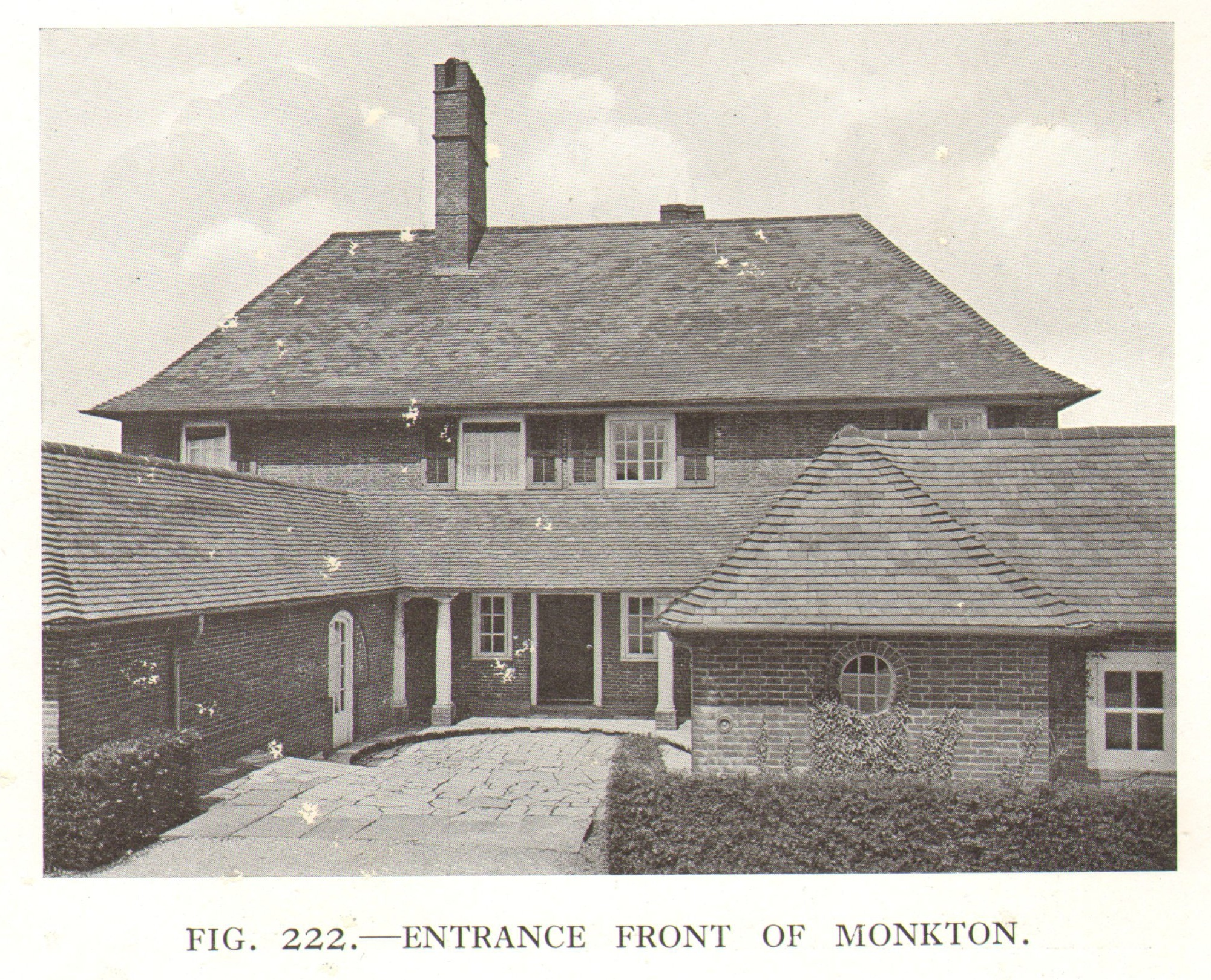
The entrance front

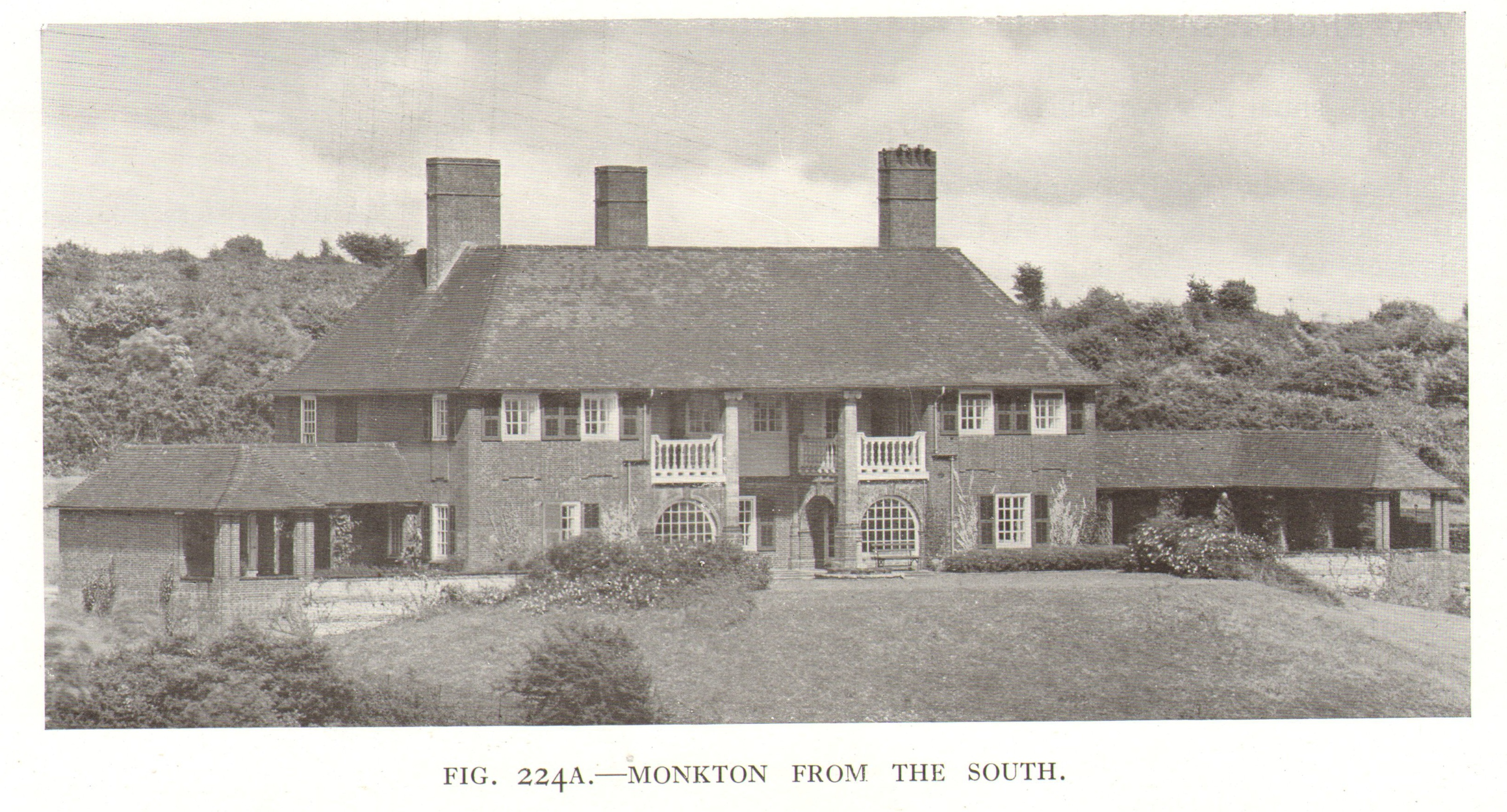
The garden front

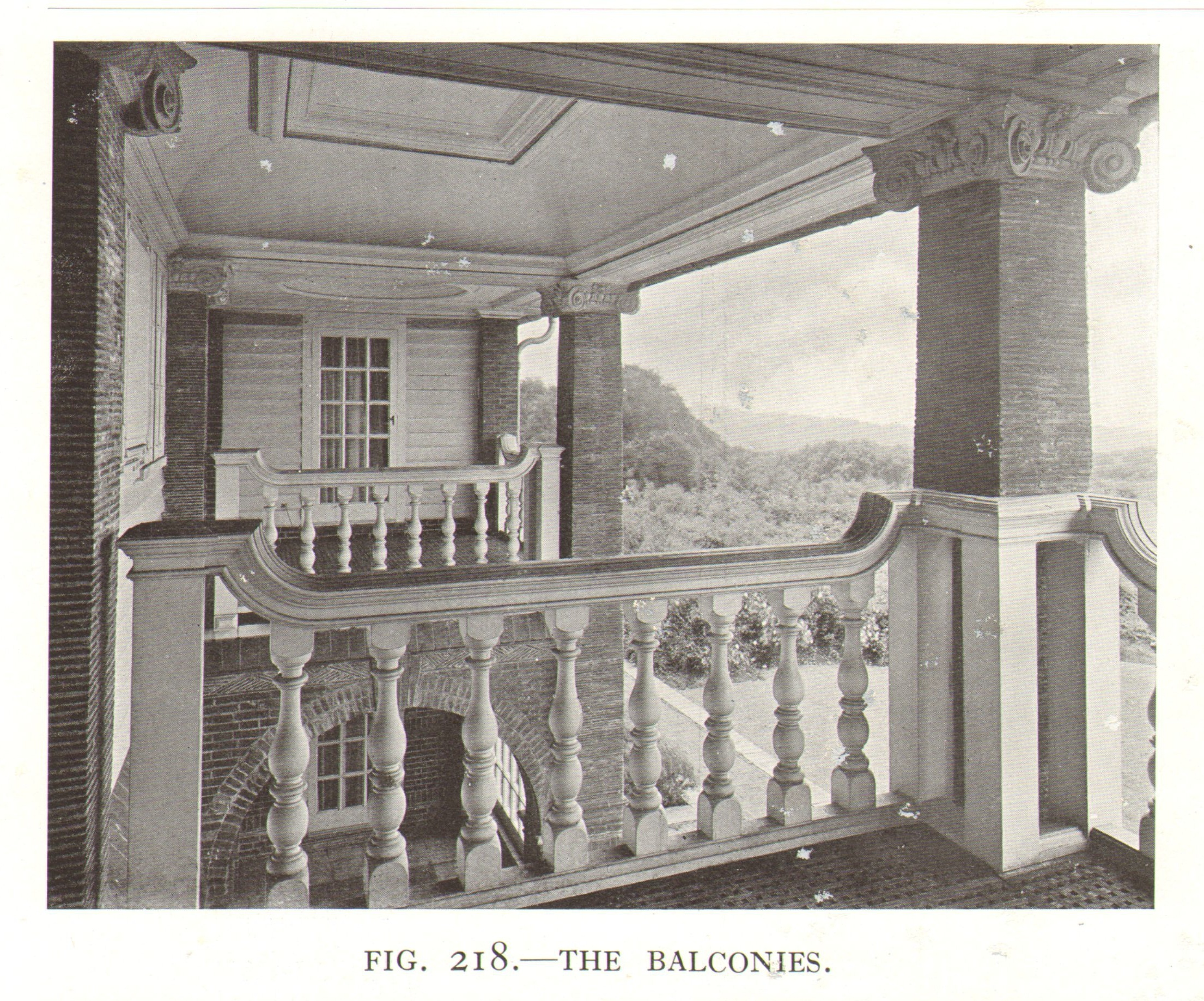
Balconies

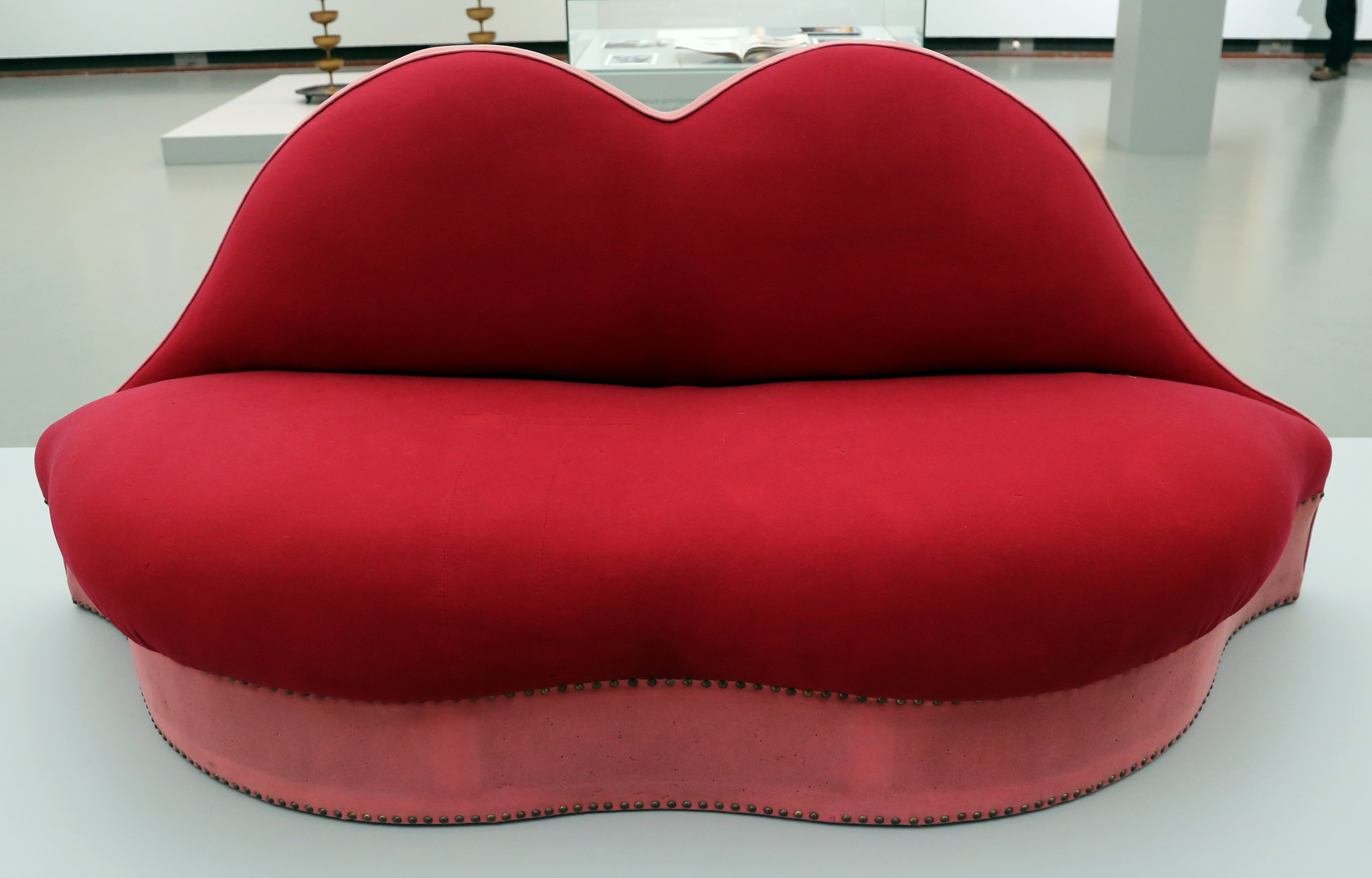
Mae West Lips Sofa

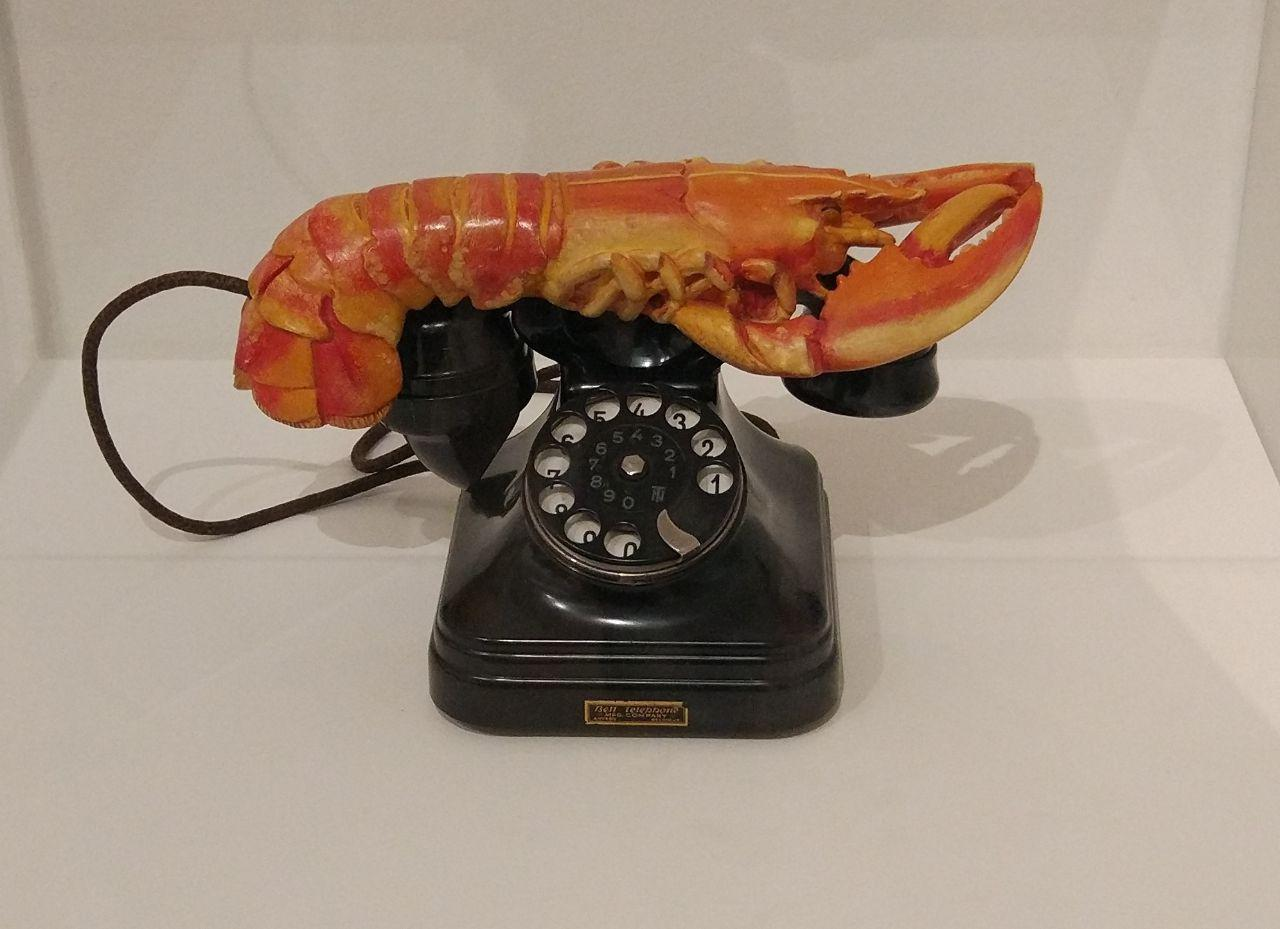
Lobster Telephone
