= Champagne Standard Lamps =

Floor lamps by Salvador Dalí

- Artist: Salvador Dalí
- Year: 1938–1939
- Dimensions: 160 cm × 40 cm (63 in × 16 in)
- Location: Victoria and Albert Museum, London

The Champagne Standard Lamps are two pairs of floor lamps designed by Salvador Dalí between 1938 and 1939.

== History ==
The lamps were created by Salvador Dalí for the British Surrealist collector Edward James in the late 1930s. James, a friend and patron of Dalí's from the early 1930s, was the owner of Monkton House, in West Sussex, England, which he had inherited from his father Willie James as part of the wider West Dean estate. The elder James had commissioned Edwin Lutyens to design Monkton in 1902. In the 1930s, Edward James, disliking the "cottagey" style of the house, engaged Christopher Nicholson and Hugh Casson to redesign it, and commissioned Dalí to assist in the design and lead on the decoration. The result has been described as "the only complete Surrealist house ever created in Britain".

On James' death in 1984, Monkton House came into the ownership of the Edward James Foundation which subsequently determined to sell the house and dispose of its contents at auction. A spirited attempt was made to save both for the nation but this was unsuccessful. A five-day auction of the contents, described as "The Edward James Collection", was held by Christie's in June 1986 on the lawn of West Dean College. The auction raised £4,516,544 (equivalent to £16,715,899 in 2023). The architectural historian Gavin Stamp mourned the loss: "had this ensemble not been broken up, Britain could now boast the finest collection of Surrealist art in the world".

Some years later the Foundation, which had retained some of the pieces from Monkton, decided to sell one of the pairs of Champagne Standard Lamps. The Department of Culture, Media and Sport imposed an export ban in an effort to prevent their being sold abroad and they were ultimately acquired by the Victoria and Albert Museum, along with one of the Mae West Lips Sofas. The V&A considered James a "key figure in the promotion and international recognition of Surrealism", and described his collection, much of which was once held at Monkton, as "one of the largest and most important in the world".

The lamps, bought for £425,000, are displayed in the V&A's Twentieth Century Gallery, alongside the Mae West Lips Sofa. The other pair of lamps remains in the ownership of the Edward James Foundation.

== Description ==
The Champagne Standard Lamps are made of copper alloy. They stand 1.6 metres (5.2 ft) high. They each comprise ten stacked champagne coupes, some of which function as ashtrays, mounted on papier-mâché trays and surmounted by light fittings. The V&A considers them among "the most important examples of Surrealist lighting in Britain".
