= Mae West Lips Sofa =

Sofa designed by Salvador Dalí

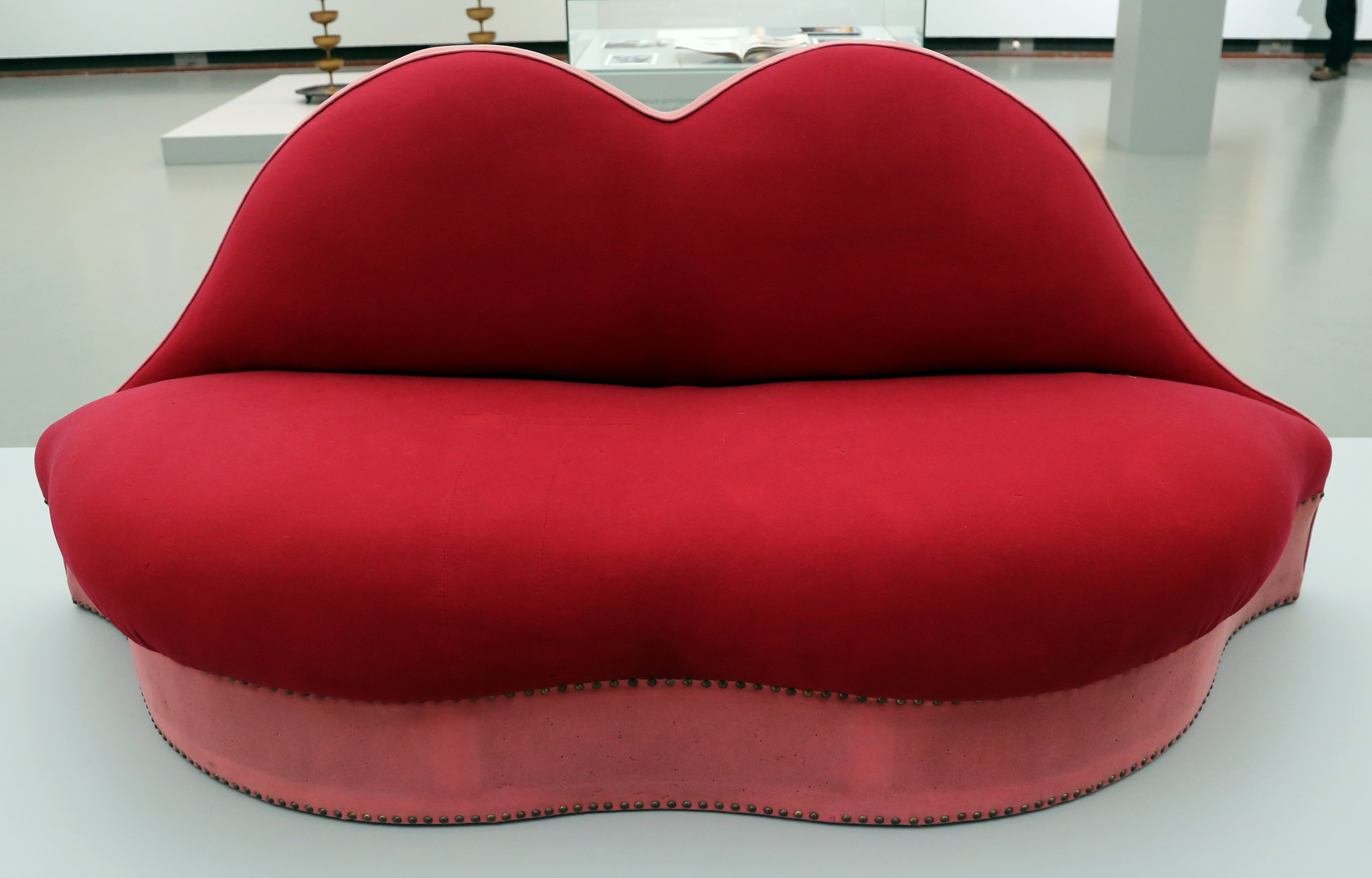
On display at the Museum Boijmans Van Beuningen, Rotterdam, 2017

The Mae West Lips Sofa is a surrealist sculpture in the form of a sofa by Salvador Dalí. The light red, 110 cm × 183 cm × 81.5 cm (43 in × 72 in × 32 in) sized seating furniture made of polyurethane foam (note: polyurethane was invented in 1937 and became accessible in late 1950s only) coated with a red polidur coating was shaped after the lips of actress Mae West, whom Dalí apparently found fascinating. Dalí never intended for the sofa to serve a functional use. He also claimed that he partly based the design of the sofa on a pile of rocks near Cadaqués and Portlligat, where he stayed for many years with his wife, Gala Éluard Dalí.

Edward James, a rich British patron of the Surrealists, originally commissioned the piece from Dalí. The original five versions were produced in 1937–38, which are now held in the art collections of the Museum Boijmans Van Beuningen in Rotterdam, West Dean College, Sussex the Victoria and Albert Museum, the Brighton Museum, and the National Gallery of Victoria in Melbourne, Australia.

The sofa was reproduced in 1973 by Baccio Design, known also as BD Barcelona Design.

== See also ==
- Lobster Telephone
- Rainy Taxi
- List of works by Salvador Dalí
