= Tilly Losch =

Austrian dancer

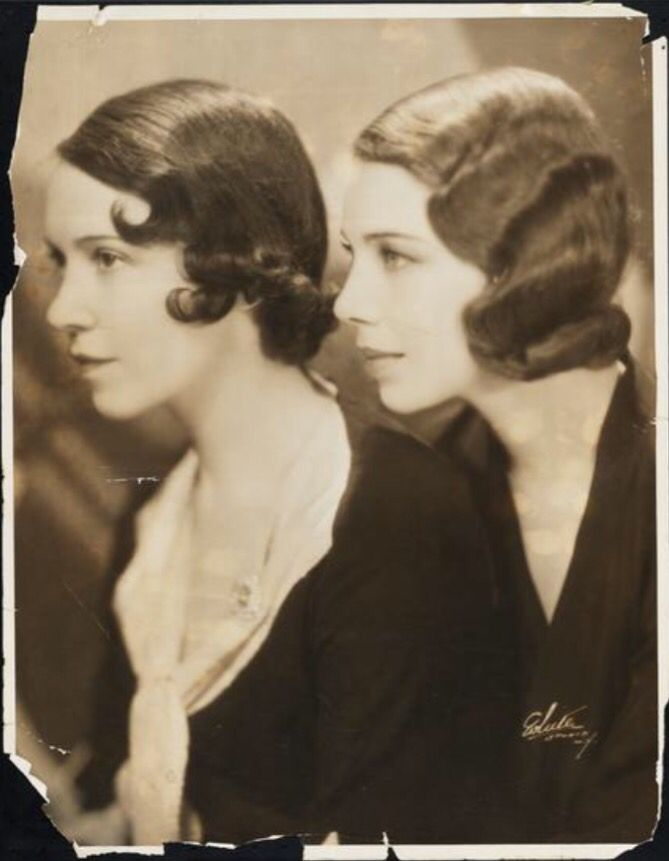
- Adele Astaire (left) with Tilly Losch in 1931
- Born: Ottilie Ethel Leopoldine Losch; November 15, 1903; Vienna, Austro-Hungarian Empire
- Died: December 24, 1975 (aged 72); New York City, U.S.
- Years active: 1913–1946
- Spouses: Edward James (m. 1930; div. 1934) Henry Herbert, 6th Earl of Carnarvon (m. 1939; div. 1947)

Ottilie Ethel Leopoldine, Countess of Carnarvon (née Losch; November 15, 1903 – December 24, 1975), known professionally as Tilly Losch, was an Austrian dancer, choreographer, actress, and painter who lived and worked for most of her life in the United States and United Kingdom.

== Early life ==
Born in Vienna, Losch studied ballet from childhood at the Vienna Opera, making her debut in 1913 in Louis Frappart's 1885 Wiener Walzer. She became a member of the corps de ballet on March 1, 1918 and a coryphee three years later. Her first solo role was the Chinese Lady Doll in Josef Hassreiter's Die Puppenfee. Ballet master Heinrich Kroeller and the Opera's co-director, composer Richard Strauss, promoted her to soloist on January 1, 1924. She danced prominently in new ballets by Kroeller, Georgi Kyaksht, and Nicola Guerra. Outside the Opera, Losch took modern dance class with Grete Wiesenthal and Mary Wigman, and performed dramatic and movement roles in Viennese theaters, at the Salzburg Festival and in Max Reinhardt's 1924 Berlin production of A Midsummer Night's Dream, also choreographing the William Shakespeare play. Losch resigned from the Vienna Opera on August 31, 1927, in order to work more with Reinhardt at the Salzburg Festival and in New York City. She also choreographed Reinhardt's Everyman and Danton's Death.

Losch made her London debut in 1928 in Cochran's production of Noël Coward's musical revue This Year of Grace, and over the course of the next few years, worked in London and New York as both a dancer and choreographer. In New York she danced in The Band Wagon with Fred and Adele Astaire in 1931. Reinhardt encouraged her to extend herself and believed she could also act; casting her in a 1932 London production of The Miracle, Losch's part was rewritten to provide her with the only spoken dialogue in the production (The Lord's Prayer) which she recited to dramatic effect.

== First marriage ==
Losch's first husband, the Anglo-American millionaire and surrealist arts patron Edward James, founded a ballet company for her – Les Ballets 1933, which performed in London and Paris. George Balanchine, whom she had met in Berlin in 1924 and who helped her with some of her choreography, was artistic director and the entire repertory was choreographed by him. Its most popular work was The 7 Deadly Sins with Kurt Weill's music and Bertolt Brecht's text. Losch danced the leading role (a dual figure) and Lotte Lenya, with whom she had a love affair at that time, sang it. Tom Mitford (the Hon. Thomas Mitford, brother of the Mitford sisters) was described as Tilly's regular lover during this marriage. Losch was divorced by James in 1934, after being accused by him of adultery with Prince Serge Obolensky, a Russian-American hotel executive. Her countersuit, in which she alleged cruelty and neglect, made it clear that her husband was homosexual, failed and was dismissed. Court proceedings in London ran for eight days, with Losch calling witnesses including Sir Thomas Beecham, then Director of the London Philharmonic Orchestra, and Randolph Churchill. The son of future British prime minister Winston Churchill, Randolph Churchill is believed to have lost his virginity to Losch at San Simeon, the home of press baron William Randolph Hearst.

A permanent reminder of Tilly Losch could be seen at Edward James' former home Monkton House on his West Dean estate. Her "wet" footprints were woven into the carpet on the spiral staircase. As Tilly emerged from the bath, leaving behind a trail of wet footprints as she ascended the spiral stairs, Edward subsequently commissioned the carpet with the motif woven into it as a token of his love for her. After their divorce Edward moved the carpet to West Dean House (now West Dean College, where it can still be seen) replacing it at Monkton with a similar carpet made with his dog's footprint.

== Drama and film ==
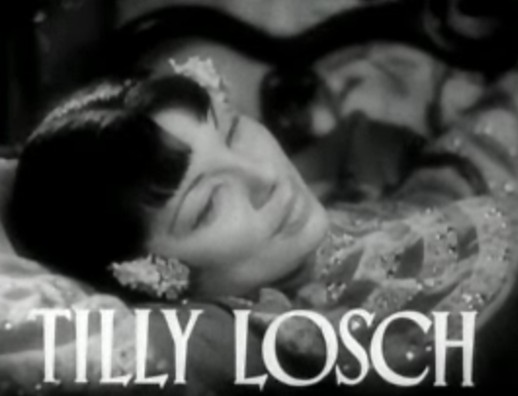
Losch pictured in the trailer for the film The Good Earth (1937).

Losch extended her work into drama, and achieved her greatest popularity in England. Her stage success led her into Hollywood films. She appeared in several screen productions including Limelight (1936), The Garden of Allah (1936), The Good Earth (1937), and Duel in the Sun (1946). Her choreography was seen in Song of Scheherazade (1947). Dissatisfied with supporting film roles, she continued working as a dancer and choreographer and acted on Broadway. Losch guested with Ballet Theatre in New York in a work by Antony Tudor and in London danced Léonide Massine choreography. Her best known conception was "The Hand Dance" (a collaboration with her Viennese colleague, Hedy Pfundmayr) which is featured in a short dance film by Norman Bel Geddes. Prominent choreographers who made roles for Losch include Sir Frederick Ashton, Fred Astaire, George Balanchine, Heinrich Kroeller, Leonide Massine, and Antony Tudor.

== Second marriage ==
A severe clinical depression caused Losch to spend time in a sanatorium in Switzerland and abandon dance. It was during this time that she married Henry Herbert, 6th Earl of Carnarvon. The marriage was performed before opening hours in a London register office on September 1, 1939. Losch began painting, first in watercolors and then later in oils. Her earliest works were self-portraits, but she later created portraits of friends such as Anita Loos, Lotte Lenya, and Kurt Weill, and she received encouragement from Cecil Beaton. Carnarvon, aware of Losch's delicate health, sent her to the United States, where he perceived she would be safe from the growing danger of the war in Europe. She mounted her first exhibition in New York City in 1944, and was well received by critics; the prominent collector and museum founder Albert C. Barnes bought one of Losch's works from her Dutch debut show.

She later combined visual elements of dance into her paintings, and often placed her subjects on a backdrop that evoked scenes of the war in Europe. As her style of painting developed she won acclaim. Her works were eventually purchased by London's Tate and other galleries.

Losch's marriage to Carnarvon ended in divorce in 1947 and she commuted between London and New York City for the remainder of her life.

== Death ==
Losch died from cancer in New York on December 24, 1975. Lord Carnarvon was among the many mourners at her funeral. She bequeathed many of her personal documents, sketches, paintings, and photographs to the Max Reinhardt Archives at Binghamton University, State University of New York.

Tilly's ashes are interred in the grounds of Leopoldskron Castle, near Salzburg.

== Filmography ==
Year	Title	Role	Notes
1936	The Garden of Allah	Irena	
1936	Limelight	Dancer	
1937	The Good Earth	Lotus	
1946	Duel in the Sun	Mrs. Chavez	(final film role)

== Sources ==
- Andrea Amort: "Tilly Losch und Hedy Pfundmayr. Ausdruck und Verführung. Zwei Ballettstars aus Wien im Sog der Moderne". In: Tanz der Hände. (= Beiträge zur Geschichte der Fotografie in Österreich, ed. Monika Faber; vol. 7) Wien 2013, S. 27–41.
- Les Ballets 1933. Catalogue of the Royal Pavilion, Art Gallery & Museums, Brighton. 1987. Preface by Boris Kochno. Lawrence-Allen Ltd. ISBN 0-948723-07-6.
- International Encyclopedia of Dance. Oxford University Press: 1998.
