= Rainy Taxi =

Sculpture by Salvador Dalí

Coordinates: 42.2681°N 2.9594°E

Rainy Taxi, also known as Mannequin Rotting in a Taxi-Cab, by Salvador Dalí, detail photograph from 1938 by Raoul Ubac

Rainy Taxi, also known as Mannequin Rotting in a Taxi-Cab, is a three-dimensional artwork created by Salvador Dalí, in 1938, consisting of an actual automobile with two mannequin occupants.

== Description ==
A male chauffeur with a shark head is in the front seat, and a female passenger sits in the back seat. The woman wears an evening dress, her hair is tousled, and lettuce and chicory grow around her. Live snails crawl across her body. The whole thing is watered by rain falling inside the car, generated by an ingenious system of pipes, activated by the public by a €1 coin changer, in the version that exists at the Dalí Theatre and Museum.

The piece was first displayed in 1938 at the Galerie Beaux-Arts in Paris at the Exposition Internationale du Surréalisme, organised by André Breton and Paul Éluard. The main hall of the Exposition was designed by Marcel Duchamp and Wolfgang Paalen, who was responsible for the supervision of the water installations.

A reconstruction of the original installation is installed in the open courtyard of the Dalí Theatre and Museum, in Figueres.

== See also ==
- List of works by Salvador Dalí
- Mae West Lips Sofa
- Lobster Telephone
