= List of Cal State Fullerton Titans in the NFL draft =

This is a list of Cal State Fullerton Titans football players in the NFL draft.

== Key ==
B	Back	K	Kicker	NT	Nose tackle
C	Center	LB	Linebacker	FB	Fullback
DB	Defensive back	P	Punter	HB	Halfback
DE	Defensive end	QB	Quarterback	WR	Wide receiver
DT	Defensive tackle	RB	Running back	G	Guard
E	End	T	Offensive tackle	TE	Tight end

== Selections ==
Year	Round	Pick	Overall	Player	Team	Position
1977	10	16	267	Aaron Ball	Tampa Bay Buccaneers	LB
1981	8	9	202	Bobby Kemp	Cincinnati Bengals	DB
1984	9	15	239	Lee Miller	San Francisco 49ers	DB
1985	2	10	38	Daren Gilbert	New Orleans Saints	T
1985	10	4	256	Andre Pinesett	Indianapolis Colts	DT
1986	2	17	44	Mark Collins	New York Giants	DB
1986	4	25	107	James Pruitt	Miami Dolphins	WR
1986	7	3	169	Corn Redick	Philadelphia Eagles	WR
1986	8	22	216	Hank Goebel	Los Angeles Rams	T
1987	9	7	230	Rick Calhoun	Detroit Lions	RB
1987	9	18	241	Ron McLean	New York Jets	DT
1988	4	23	105	James Thornton	Chicago Bears	TE
1988	7	11	176	Todd White	Philadelphia Eagles	WR
1989	8	24	219	Alex Stewart	Minnesota Vikings	DE
1989	9	5	228	A. J. Jenkins	Pittsburgh Steelers	LB
1989	9	23	246	Jerry Leggett	New Orleans Saints	LB
1990	5	12	121	Reggie Redding	Atlanta Falcons	G
1990	6	2	139	Mike Pringle	Atlanta Falcons	RB
1992	10	7	259	Reggie Yarbrough	Phoenix Cardinals	RB
