= Robert Jackson (guard) =

American football player (born 1953)

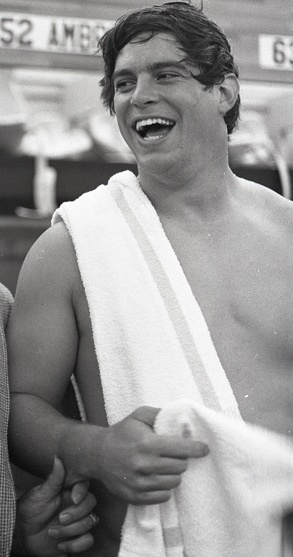
- Jackson in 1979

No. 68
- Position: Guard

Personal information
- Born: April 1, 1953 (age 73); Charlotte, North Carolina, U.S.
- Listed height: 6 ft 5 in (1.96 m)
- Listed weight: 255 lb (116 kg)

Career information
- High school: North Mecklenburg (Huntersville, North Carolina)
- College: Duke
- NFL draft: 1975: undrafted

Career history
- Cleveland Browns (1975–1985)

Awards and highlights
- Cleveland Browns legends (2014)

Career NFL statistics
- Games played: 160
- Games started: 127
- Fumble recoveries: 6
- Stats at Pro Football Reference

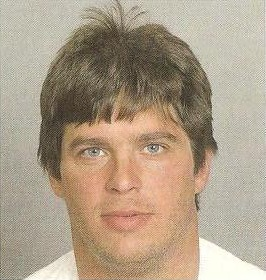

Robert Edward Jackson (born April 1, 1953) is an American former professional football player who was a guard for 11 seasons with the Cleveland Browns of the National Football League (NFL). Jackson played college football for the Duke Blue Devils, arriving as a quarterback (a position he played at North Mecklenburg High School) with his twin brother Ken, a tight end. Jackson filled out over his time at Duke, eventually landing on the offensive line. From a humble start as a free agent, he was honored as a Cleveland Browns Legend in September 2014.

Jackson started working in the insurance business in the offseason during his playing career. He and Doug Dieken eventually formed Jackson Dieken and Associates in Westlake, Ohio, where Jackson serves as principal.
