= North Mecklenburg High School =

Educational institution in North Carolina

Location
- 11201 Old Statesville Rd; Huntersville, North Carolina 28078; United States; 35°22′24″N 80°50′02″W

Information
- Other name: North Meck; North
- Type: Public
- Established: 1951 (75 years ago)
- School district: Charlotte-Mecklenburg Schools
- CEEB code: 341925
- Principal: Stephanie Hood
- Teaching staff: 115.57 (on an FTE basis)
- Enrollment: 2,061 (2023–2024)
- Student to teacher ratio: 17.83
- Colors: Red, white, and blue
- Athletics: NCHSAA 7A
- Athletics conference: Meck Power Six 7A/8A
- Sports: Baseball, Basketball, Cheerleading, Cross Country, Football, Golf, Rugby, Soccer, Softball, Swimming, Tennis, Track, Volleyball, Wrestling
- Team name: Vikings
- Website: www.cmsk12.org/northmecklenburghs

North Mecklenburg High School is a high school in Huntersville, North Carolina. The school mascot is the Viking, and the school colors are royal blue, red, and white. Founded in 1951, the school was integrated during the 1960s. The principal is Stephanie Hood.

== History ==
North Mecklenburg High School first opened its doors to students on September 4, 1951. Many of North Meck's first expansions occurred in 1957, with the addition of the H-hall to meet the needs of the growing student population. During the 1960s, North's curriculum expanded to include instruction in Art, Orchestra, Drama, Spanish, Child Care, Auto Mechanics and ROTC.

Desegregation began at North Meck during the 1965–1966 school year. By 1969, the school had been fully integrated. During the early 1970s, North Meck's student population had reached around 1,100 students.

By the 2000–2001 school year, North Meck had grown into the largest high school in North Carolina, with over 2,700 students. To help alleviate with the growing student body, the school added more buildings and mobile classrooms. In the 2001–2002 school year, nearby Hopewell High School opened its doors, to help with the needs of the growing Huntersville community.

== Curriculum ==
North Mecklenburg High School offers a comprehensive program including International Baccalaureate, which is the most rigorous program at North Meck, Advanced Placement, Academically Gifted, and advanced classes, fine arts programs, Air Force JROTC, and a variety of workforce development courses. The school serves as a World Language Magnet High School for Charlotte-Mecklenburg Schools. The school has one of two auto tech courses in North Carolina. Eighty-six percent of graduates attend four-year colleges, universities, or junior colleges.

== Extracurricular activities ==
=== Sports ===
North Mecklenburg High School is a member of the North Carolina High School Athletic Association (NCHSAA) and is classified as a 7A school. North Mecklenburg competes in the Meck Power Six 7A/8A Conference. The conference consists of Charlotte/Mecklenburg County Schools.

=== Speech and Debate team ===
The Speech and Debate team, a member of the National Speech and Debate Association, is active in both North and South Carolina, as well as in the national circuit. The team hosts the annual "The Jimmy K Poole Viking Classic" each October. They have coached several students who went onto be state champions, ranked number 1 nationwide in their events, and several National Semi-finalists, Finalists, and Champions.

== Notable alumni ==
- Duggar Baucom, college basketball head coach
- Isaiah Evans, basketball player who played for the Duke Blue Devils Before getting drafted by the Brooklyn Nets 33rd Overall before getting traded to the Minnesota Timberwolves
- Jeff Hammond, NASCAR personality and commentator
- Larry Hefner, NFL linebacker with the Green Bay Packers 1972–1975
- Melvin Hoover, former NFL wide receiver
- Robert Jackson, NFL offensive guard with the Cleveland Browns 1975–1985
- DeMarco Johnson, professional basketball player
- Eddie Knox, mayor of Charlotte and state senator
- Bishop Eddie L. Long, served as senior pastor of New Birth Missionary Baptist Church in Lithonia, Georgia
- Mujtaba A. Mohammed, American politician, member of the North Carolina Senate
- Alyssa Ramsey, soccer player who played for the United States women's national team
- River Ryan, MLB pitcher in the Los Angeles Dodgers organization
- Ryder Ryan, MLB pitcher in the Texas Rangers organization, member of USA 2020 Olympic baseball team
- Jamie Skeen, professional basketball player
- Andrea Stinson, three-time WNBA All-Star with the Charlotte Sting
- Tony Wike, actor, radio personality and journalist
- Scott Williams, former NFL fullback and tight end
- Emanuel Wilson, NFL running back
- Jae'Lyn Withers, professional basketball player
