= Reggie Rogers =

American gridiron football player (1964–2013)

No. 60, 77, 75, 90
- Position: Defensive tackle

Personal information
- Born: January 21, 1964; Sacramento, California, U.S.
- Died: October 24, 2013 (aged 49); Seattle, Washington, U.S.
- Listed height: 6 ft 6 in (1.98 m)
- Listed weight: 278 lb (126 kg)

Career information
- High school: Norte Del Rio (Sacramento)
- College: Washington
- NFL draft: 1987: 1st round, 7th overall pick

Career history
- Detroit Lions (1987–1988); Buffalo Bills (1991); Tampa Bay Buccaneers (1992); Hamilton Tiger-Cats (1993–1994); Shreveport Pirates (1995)

Awards and highlights
- Consensus All-American (1986); Morris Trophy (1986); 2× First-team All-Pac-10 (1985, 1986)

Career NFL statistics
- Sacks: 2
- Stats at Pro Football Reference

Reginald O'Keith Rogers (January 21, 1964 – October 24, 2013) was an American professional football player who was a defensive tackle who played four seasons in the National Football League (NFL) for the Detroit Lions (1987–1988), Buffalo Bills (1991), and Tampa Bay Buccaneers (1992).

A consensus All-American for the Washington Huskies in Seattle under head coach Don James, Rogers was chosen seventh overall in the 1987 NFL draft by the Lions. However, he only played six games of his rookie season due to a slew of emotional problems, even spending time in a counseling center. His second season in 1988 ended after only five games when his car struck another vehicle and killed three teenagers early on Thursday, October 20. He was later found to have a blood alcohol content of 0.15, the legal limit in Michigan being 0.10 at the time. The Lions waived him in July 1989, not because of the felony charges, but because he broke his neck in the collision. In 1990, he was convicted of vehicular homicide and spent 13 months in prison.

Following his sentence, Rogers had brief stints with Buffalo and Tampa Bay, but was out the NFL after the 1992 season. He made his way to the Canadian Football League and played for the Hamilton Tiger-Cats (1993–94) and one of the U.S. expansion teams, the Shreveport Pirates (1995). He played 33 games in the CFL and accumulated 18 sacks and 91 tackles in three-down football.

Rogers is often considered among the biggest draft busts in NFL history. In 2008, ESPN named him the 13th-biggest bust since the AFL-NFL merger. A year earlier, Yahoo! Sports named him the worst #7 pick since the merger.

On November 26, 2008, Rogers was involved in a hit-and-run collision in Tukwila that resulted in his arrest and a charge of DUI. It was his fifth arrest for DUI in the state of Washington, dating back to his college days at UW.

Rogers also played three seasons for the Husky basketball team under head coach Marv Harshman.

== Personal life ==
Rogers had six children; twins Reggie & Regina, Amanda, Brittany, Isiah, and Jackie. His oldest daughter Brittany died from an enlarged heart.

His daughter, Regina Rogers-Wright, attended UCLA and University of Washington and was an All American and 2012 WNBA draft nominee. Regina, led the nation in field goal percentage her senior year at the University of Washington with 57%. Regina, recently had her jersey retired at Chief Sealth International School in 2020. He was the younger brother of Cleveland Browns safety Don Rogers, who died of cocaine poisoning at age 23 in June 1986.

== Death ==
At age 49, Rogers was found dead at his home in Seattle in 2013. An autopsy revealed that he died of combined cocaine and alcohol intoxication.

== See also ==
- Washington Huskies football statistical leaders
