= Danny McCoin =

Profile
- Position: Quarterback

Personal information
- Born: August 31, 1964 (age 62)
- Listed height: 6 ft 3 in (1.91 m)
- Listed weight: 206 lb (93 kg)

Career information
- College: Cincinnati (1984–1987)
- NFL draft: 1988: 11th round, 281st overall pick

Career history
- Detroit Lions (1988)*
- * Offseason or practice squad member only

Danny McCoin (born August 31, 1964) is a former American football quarterback. He played college football for the Cincinnati Bearcats from 1984 to 1987. As a junior in 1986, he ranked among the leading quarterbacks in major-college football with a 64.2% completion percentage (1st), 237 pass completions (4th), 2,831 passing yards (6th), 257.4 yards gained per game played (6th), 438 total plays (7th), and 2,585 total yards (10th). Billed as "a bona fide Heisman Trophy quarterback" prior to the 1987 season, he suffered a knee injury and underwent arthroscopic surgery in October 1987 to repair the damage. He concluded his college football career with 6,801 passing yards. McCoin was drafted by the Detroit Lions in the 11th round of the 1988 NFL draft (281st overall pick) and played with the club in the preseason, but he was released befreo the regular season began.
