= Melvin Hoover =

American football player (born 1959)

No. 85, 83
- Position: Wide receiver

Personal information
- Born: September 21, 1959 (age 67); Charlotte, North Carolina, U.S.
- Listed height: 6 ft 0 in (1.83 m)
- Listed weight: 180 lb (82 kg)

Career information
- High school: North Mecklenburg (Huntersville, North Carolina)
- College: Arizona State
- NFL draft: 1981: 6th round, 145th overall pick

Career history
- New York Giants (1981)*; Green Bay Packers (1981)*; Philadelphia Eagles (1982–1985); Detroit Lions (1987)
- * Offseason or practice squad member only

Career NFL statistics
- Receptions: 16
- Receiving yards: 364
- Receiving touchdowns: 2
- Stats at Pro Football Reference

Melvin Condell Hoover (born September 21, 1959) is an American former professional football player who was a wide receiver in the National Football League (NFL). He played college football for the Arizona State Sun Devils.

== Early life ==
Hoover was born and grew up in Charlotte, North Carolina and attended North Mecklenburg High School, where he played basketball and football.

== College career ==
Hoover was a member of the Arizona State Sun Devils for four seasons. He was the team's leading kick returner as a freshman and as a sophomore and was named Arizona State's most improved player as a junior.

== Professional career ==
Hoover was selected 145th overall in the sixth round of the 1981 NFL draft by the New York Giants, but was cut during training camp. Hoover was signed by the Philadelphia Eagles on May 18, 1982 and played three seasons with the team.

Hoover was cut during the 1985 preseason after he was unable to agree a new contract with Eagles new owner Norman Braman. He had previously come to terms on a new contract with the expectation to sign, but then stopped showing up to training camp around a week later without telling the team or his agent, apparently having changed his mind on the new contract. He later did confirm this, and further negotiations fell through.

Hoover did not play during the 1985 and 1986 seasons but was signed by the Detroit Lions as a replacement player during the 1987 NFL players strike, playing in two games and was released when the strike ended. Hoover finished his NFL career with 16 receptions for 364 yards and two touchdowns in 34 games played.
