= Ivan Hicks =

British garden designer

Ivan Hicks is a British garden designer and landscape artist known for his imaginative and eccentric garden designs.

== Biography ==
Trained as an arboriculturalist, Hicks started his professional career as head gardener to surrealist art patron Edward James at his Sussex estate, West Dean. He helped James create his gardens in England, Italy, and 'Las Pozas' in Xilitla, San Luis Potosí, Mexico. After James' death, Hicks continued to live as garden manager at West Dean before moving on to other projects.

Hicks was a presenter on Gardener's World from 1999 to 2001.

He has won a few awards, including one from the British Association of Landscape Industries for his raised treetop walkway, The Dark Walk, in the Enchanted Forest at Groombridge Place in Kent.

== Important designs ==
- Lead designer for Butterfly World, St Albans
- Enchanted Forest, Groombridge Place, Kent
- Garden in Mind, Hampshire
