= Carl Painter =

American football player (born 1964)

No. 26, 27
- Position: Running back

Personal information
- Born: May 10, 1964 (age 62); Norfolk, Virginia, U.S.
- Listed height: 5 ft 9 in (1.75 m)
- Listed weight: 184 lb (83 kg)

Career information
- High school: Booker T. Washington (Norfolk)
- College: Hampton
- NFL draft: 1988: 6th round, 142nd overall pick

Career history
- Detroit Lions (1988–1989); Orlando Thunder (1991)

Career NFL statistics
- Rushing yards: 106
- Rushing average: 3.3
- Receptions: 4
- Receiving yards: 42
- Stats at Pro Football Reference

Carl Painter (born May 10, 1964) is an American former professional football player who was a running back for the Detroit Lions of the National Football League (NFL) from 1988 to 1989. He was played college football for the Hampton Pirates and selected by the Lions in the sixth round of the 1988 NFL draft.
