= Chuck Steele (American football) =

American football player (born 1964)

No. 60
- Position: Center

Personal information
- Born: June 22, 1964 (age 62); Los Angeles, California, U.S.
- Listed height: 6 ft 1 in (1.85 m)
- Listed weight: 255 lb (116 kg)

Career information
- High school: El Modena (Orange, California)
- College: California
- NFL draft: 1987: undrafted

Career history
- Detroit Lions (1987)

Career NFL statistics
- Games played: 3
- Games started: 1
- Stats at Pro Football Reference

Charles Anson Steele (born June 22, 1964) is an American former professional football player who was a center for the Detroit Lions of the National Football League (NFL). He played college football for the California Golden Bears.
