= Gary Hadd =

American football player (born 1965)

No. 71, 73
- Position: Defensive tackle

Personal information
- Born: October 19, 1965 (age 61); Saint Paul, Minnesota, U.S.
- Listed height: 6 ft 4 in (1.93 m)
- Listed weight: 274 lb (124 kg)

Career information
- High school: Burnsville (MN)
- College: Minnesota
- NFL draft: 1988: 8th round, 196th overall pick

Career history
- Detroit Lions (1988); Phoenix Cardinals (1989 - 90); Detroit Lions (1988, 1991)*
- * Offseason or practice squad member only
- Stats at Pro Football Reference

Gary Allan Hadd (born October 19, 1965) is an American former professional football defensive tackle. He played for the Detroit Lions in 1988,1991 and for the Phoenix Cardinals in 1989,1990. He was selected 196th overall by the Lions in the eighth round of the 1988 NFL draft.
