= Steve Hirsch =

American football player (born 1959)

No. 42
- Position: Defensive back

Personal information
- Born: May 18, 1962 (age 64); Pontiac, Michigan, U.S.
- Listed height: 6 ft 0 in (1.83 m)
- Listed weight: 195 lb (88 kg)

Career information
- High school: Lahser
- College: Northern Illinois
- NFL draft: 1984: undrafted

Career history
- Ottawa Rough Riders (1985); Detroit Lions (1987)

Career NFL statistics
- Games played: 3
- Games started: 1
- Stats at Pro Football Reference

Steven Wendell Hirsch (born May 15, 1962) is an American former professional football player who was a defensive back for the Detroit Lions of the National Football League (NFL) as a replacement player during the 1987 player's strike. He played college football for the Northern Illinois Huskies.
