= Rick Calhoun =

American football player (born 1963)

No. 21
- Position: Running back

Personal information
- Born: May 30, 1963 (age 63); Montgomery, Alabama, U.S.
- Listed height: 5 ft 7 in (1.70 m)
- Listed weight: 190 lb (86 kg)

Career information
- High school: John W. North (Riverside, California)
- College: Cal State-Fullerton
- NFL draft: 1987: 9th round, 230th overall pick

Career history
- Detroit Lions (1987)*; Los Angeles Raiders (1987); Los Angeles Rams (1987)
- * Offseason or practice squad member only

Career NFL statistics
- Rushing yards: 36
- Rushing average: 5.1
- Receptions: 1
- Receiving yards: 17
- Stats at Pro Football Reference

James Rickey Calhoun (born May 30, 1963) is an American former professional football player who was a running back for the Los Angeles Raiders of the National Football League (NFL). He played college football for the Cal State Fullerton Titans.
