= Lobster Telephone =

1936 surrealist sculpture by Salvador Dali

Lobster Telephone (also known as Aphrodisiac Telephone) is a Surrealist object, created by Salvador Dalí in 1936 for the English poet Edward James (1907–1984), a leading collector of surrealist art. In his 1942 book The Secret Life of Salvador Dalí, Dalí wrote teasingly of his demand to know why, when he asked for a grilled lobster in a restaurant, he was never presented with a boiled telephone.

== Description ==
The work is a composite of an ordinary working telephone and a lobster made of plaster. It is approximately 15 × 30 × 17 cm (6 × 12 × 6.6 inches) in size.

This is a classic example of a Surrealist object, made from the conjunction of items not normally associated with each other, resulting in something both playful and menacing. Dalí believed that such objects could reveal the secret desires of the unconscious. Lobsters and telephones had strong sexual connotations for Dalí. The telephone appears in certain paintings of the late 1930s such as Mountain Lake (Tate); further, the lobster appears in drawings and designs, usually associated with erotic pleasure and pain. For the 1939 New York World's Fair, Dalí created a multi-media experience entitled Dream of Venus, which consisted in part of dressing live nude models in "costumes" made of fresh seafood, an event photographed by Horst P. Horst and George Platt Lynes. A lobster was used by the artist to cover the female sexual organs of his models. Dalí often drew a close analogy between food and sex. In Lobster Telephone, the crustacean's tail, where its sexual parts are located, is placed directly over the mouthpiece.

In 1935, Dalí was commissioned by the magazine American Weekly to execute a series of drawings based on his impressions of New York. One drawing was given the caption 'NEW YORK DREAM - MAN FINDS LOBSTER IN PLACE OF PHONE'. In the Dictionnaire Abrégé du Surréalisme of 1938, Dalí contributed an entry under 'TÉLÉPHONE APHRODISIAQUE' which is accompanied by a small drawing of a telephone, its receiver replaced by a lobster surrounded by flies. A similar drawing is printed in The Secret Life of Salvador Dalí which contains the following:

"I do not understand why, when I ask for a grilled lobster in a restaurant, I am never served a cooked telephone; I do not understand why champagne is always chilled and why on the other hand telephones, which are habitually so frightfully warm and disagreeably sticky to the touch, are not also put in silver buckets with crushed ice around them. (...)"

"Telephone frappé, mint coloured telephone, aphrodisiac telephone, lobster-telephone, telephone sheathed in sable for the boudoirs of sirens with fingernails protected with ermine, Edgar Allan Poe telephones with a dead rat concealed within, Boecklin telephones installed inside a cypress tree (and with an allegory of death in inlaid silver on their backs), telephones on the leash which would walk about, screwed to the back of a living turtle ... telephones ... telephones ... telephones ..."

== Present locations ==
Dalí produced four examples of the color version of his lobster telephone, currently displayed as part of the four following collections:

- Museum für Kommunikation Frankfurt, Germany
- National Gallery of Australia
- Tate Modern, London
- West Dean College, UK

== Off-white versions ==
Off-white Aphrodisiac Telephone (1938) Minneapolis Institute of Art

Dalí also produced an off-white version of his telephone. The six examples are displayed as following:

- Salvador Dalí Museum in St. Petersburg, Florida
- Centro Cultural de Belém, in Portugal
- Johannesburg Art Gallery, in South Africa
- Minneapolis Institute of Art, in the United States
- Museum Boijmans Van Beuningen, in Rotterdam
- Scottish National Gallery of Modern Art, in Edinburgh

== See also ==
- List of works by Salvador Dalí
