= Scott Williams (running back) =

American football player (born 1962)

No. 38
- Position: Running back

Personal information
- Born: July 21, 1962 (age 64); Charlotte, North Carolina, U.S.
- Listed height: 6 ft 2 in (1.88 m)
- Listed weight: 234 lb (106 kg)

Career information
- High school: North Mecklenburg (Huntersville, North Carolina)
- College: Georgia
- NFL draft: 1985: 9th round, 244th overall pick

Career history
- St. Louis Cardinals (1985)*; Detroit Lions (1986–1988); Chicago Bears (1990)*
- * Offseason or practice squad member only

Career NFL statistics
- Rushing yards: 73
- Rushing average: 2.4
- Receptions: 9
- Receiving yards: 71
- Total touchdowns: 4
- Stats at Pro Football Reference

Scott Williams (born July 21, 1962) is an American former professional football player who was a fullback and tight end in the National Football League (NFL). He played college football for the Georgia Bulldogs.

== Early life ==
Williams was born and grew up in Charlotte, North Carolina, and attended North Mecklenburg High School, where he played both basketball and football. Williams accepted a scholarship to play college football at Georgia over an offer to play both basketball and football at North Carolina.

== College career ==
Williams redshirted as a freshman during Georgia's national championship season in 1980 as he moved from halfback to wide receiver and then eventually to the tight end position. Williams also played on Georgia basketball's junior varsity team. He played tight end as a redshirt freshman before being moved to fullback as a redshirt sophomore. Williams was moved back to tight end before his redshirt senior season and led the Bulldogs with 19 receptions and 204 receiving yards with one touchdown reception and scored a second touchdown as a rusher.

== Professional career ==
Williams was selected by the St. Louis Cardinals in the ninth round of the 1985 NFL draft, but was released during the preseason. Williams was signed by the Detroit Lions before the 1986 season. He spent three years with the team, playing in 32 games and scoring four total touchdowns. His career was cut short due to a shoulder injury that he suffered against the Denver Broncos in 1988.
