= Karl Bernard =

American football player (born 1964)

No. 25
- Position: Running back

Personal information
- Born: October 12, 1964 (age 62); New Orleans, Louisiana, U.S.
- Listed height: 5 ft 11 in (1.80 m)
- Listed weight: 205 lb (93 kg)

Career information
- High school: Baton Rouge Catholic
- College: LSU; Southwestern Louisiana
- NFL draft: 1987: undrafted

Career history
- Detroit Lions (1987–1988)

Career NFL statistics
- Rushing yards: 187
- Rushing average: 4.2
- Touchdowns: 2
- Stats at Pro Football Reference

Karl Bernard (born October 12, 1964) is an American former professional football player who was a running back for the Detroit Lions of the National Football League (NFL). He was one of five NFL football players invited to participate in the 1989 Diet Pepsi Super Bowl Talent Challenge. He sang a song entitled Greatest Love of All. He was forced to retire in 1989 due to a career ending knee injury that occurred during team practice drills before the beginning of the 1988 NFL football season. He played college football for Louisiana State University (LSU) and later transferred to Southwestern Louisiana Ragin' Cajuns (USL) where he received the Buddy Marine Outstanding Student Athlete Award.

In 1990, He graduated from USL in Petroleum Engineering and was named USL's API Outstanding Senior in Petroleum Engineering. He later became a lawyer and an adjunct professor of law at Tulane University College (1997- 2000) and Loyola University of New Orleans College of Law (2001- present). He is the author of the book entitled Lessons From My Fathers, A Tribute to the Men Who Helped Me Become a Man
