= Edward James =

British poet and arts patron (1907–1984)

- Not to Be Reproduced, a 1937 portrait of Edward James by René Magritte
- Born: Edward Frank Willis James; 16 August 1907; West Dean House, West Dean, Sussex, England
- Died: 2 December 1984 (aged 77); Sanremo, Italy
- Resting place: St. Roche's Arboretum, West Dean, Sussex, England
- Education: Lockers Park School; Eton; Institut Le Rosey; Christ Church, Oxford
- Occupations: poet, sculptor, patron of the arts
- Spouse: Tilly Losch (m. 1930; div. 1934)
- Parent(s): William Dodge James; Evelyn Forbes

Edward Frank Willis James (16 August 1907 – 2 December 1984) was a British poet known for his patronage of the surrealist art movement.

== Early life and marriage ==
James was born on 16 August 1907, the only son of William James (who had inherited a fortune from his father, merchant Daniel James) and Evelyn Forbes, a Scots socialite. He was reputedly fathered by the Prince of Wales (later Edward VII) and in his anecdotal reminiscences, recorded in Swans Reflecting Elephants – My Early Years, Edward James also puts forward this hypothesis. In his memoirs he wrote "I was not, I was, in fact, his grandson" saying that it was his grandmother that had an affair with the Prince of Wales. However, there was also popular belief that Forbes was one of the Prince of Wales's mistresses and there was a much-quoted ballad by Hilaire Belloc intimating this at the time.

Edward James had four older sisters: Audrey, Millicent, Xandra, and Silvia. He was educated at Lockers Park School, then briefly at Eton, then at Le Rosey in Switzerland, and finally at Christ Church, Oxford, where he was a contemporary of Evelyn Waugh (Waugh attended Hertford College) and Harold Acton, a fellow student at Christ Church. When his father died in 1912 he inherited the 8,000-acre (3,200 ha) West Dean House estate in Sussex, held in trust until he came of age. He was also left a large sum in trust when his uncle John Arthur James died in 1917.

James's first sponsorship of note was in publishing John Betjeman's first book of poems when at Oxford. He worked with Brian Howard on the Glass Omnibus. After Oxford, James had a brief career as a trainee diplomat at the embassy in Rome. He was asked to send a coded message to London that the Italians had laid the keels for three destroyers, but got the code wrong; the message said "300 destroyers". Shortly after this he was sent "on indefinite leave".

In the early 1930s, James married Tilly Losch, an Austrian dancer, choreographer, actress and painter. He had several productions created expressly for her, the most notable of which was Les Ballets 1933, which included Kurt Weill, Lotte Lenya and George Balanchine. He and Boris Kochno commissioned that year Brecht and Weill's last collaboration, The Seven Deadly Sins, which Balanchine produced, directed and choreographed.

James divorced Losch in 1934, accusing her of adultery with Prince Serge Obolensky, an American hotel executive; her countersuit, in which she made it clear that James was homosexual, failed. James was in fact bisexual. After the divorce, James joined a social set in England which included the Mitford sisters and the composer Lord Berners.

== Surrealism ==
James is best known as a passionate supporter of Surrealism, a movement that evolved from Dada and the political uncertainty and upheaval of World War I and the following years. With a mix of Dada irreverence for the traditional political, religious, and bourgeois values of western civilization that they believed had led the world (and themselves as veterans of the war) to the First World War, the surrealists explored the possibilities that had been opened up by Sigmund Freud regarding the subconscious mind, and the idea of "pure thought", unfiltered and uncensored by political, religious, moral, or rational principles.

He sponsored Salvador Dalí for the whole of 1938 and his collection of paintings and art objects subsequently came to be accepted as one of the finest collections of surrealist work in private hands. He also provided practical help, supporting Dalí for about two years. They collaborated on the Mae West Sofas and Lobster Telephones, which James had installed in his private home near West Dean House.

James appeared in two surrealist paintings, both by Magritte:

- Not to Be Reproduced
- The Pleasure Principle: Portrait of Edward James

Salvador Dali put James in touch with the Belgian surrealist painter René Magritte (1898–1967). James later hosted Magritte for three weeks at his home on 35 Wimpole Street, London in February and March 1937, where Magritte painted a number of gouaches and oils, some of which were new, others were copies of his earlier work. The terms agreed on were that Magritte was to be paid £250 to paint copies or variations of three paintings selected by James from photographs: On the Threshold of Liberty (1929), The Red Model (1935), and The Youth Illustrated (1936) and pay his own travel expenses, while James was to provide a studio space above his garage as well as art supplies and canvases. James intended to install the paintings behind backless mirrors, so as to only be observable in bright light. The new version of The Red Model, painted at James’s request, was a large canvas (72 × 52.5 in.) of higher quality than the original and given a British touch with the addition of a few English coins scattered in the dirt. It is now in the Museum Boijmans van Beuningen, Rotterdam along with the 1937 version of The Youth Illustrated (79 × 60 in.). Magritte went on to paint at least seven versions of The Red Model. Magritte also enlarged and reformatted the 1937 version of On the Threshold of Liberty (94 × 73 in.), now in the Art Institute of Chicago, from horizontal to vertical to fit the intended installation site for James. In a letter to Louis Scutenaire and Irène Hamoir (18 February 1937), Magritte wrote "London is a revelation. Of course, I'm only just beginning to discover it. But until now, everything is perfect (of course I don't speak English, but "there's something"). Yesterday evening we went to visit Henry Moore, a charming sculptor, sort of Arp-Picasso..."

In June that year, Magritte painted some portraits of James including Not to be Reproduced and The Pleasure Principle. In the first, James looks into a mirror which shows the back of his head; in the second, James's head is an enigmatic radiating light. Magritte painted Pleasure Principle from photographs of James taken by Man Ray, following Magritte's precise staging instructions. The Pleasure Principle was based on a small ink sketch from the year before, titled Failed Portrait [of Paul Éluard]. In Not to be Reproduced, the book sitting on the mantel is the French edition of Edgar Allan Poe's The Narrative of Arthur Gordon Pym of Nantucket. James’s art collection included works by Hieronymus Bosch, Giorgio de Chirico, Paul Klee, Leonora Carrington, Pavel Tchelitchew, Pablo Picasso, Giacometti, Max Ernst and Paul Delvaux. Most were sold at a well-publicized sale at Christie's two years after his death.

His intellectual interest in surrealism is demonstrated by his sponsorship of Minotaure, a lavish Surrealist magazine published in Paris. His refurbishment of Monkton House, a part of the West Dean Estate, was a Surrealist dream. It was done in collaboration with the pioneering British decorator Syrie Maugham, and has some of the most iconic Surrealist works on display, including the large Mae West Lips Sofa to which Dalí gave the form and colour of the actress's lips, and his Lobster Telephone in white. (The Surrealist tradition at Monkton House was maintained when the interior designer Derek Frost did extensive work to the house and designed more custom pieces of furniture in the late 1980s.) James donated these two items (among others) to the Brighton Museum & Art Gallery. James's most fantastic Surrealist creation was a sculpture garden in the Mexican rainforest, "Las Pozas".

== New Mexico ==
In 1940, James stayed in Taos, New Mexico, United States, as a guest of Mabel Dodge Luhan, where he was known for his amusing, clever eccentricity and effeminate manner. In Taos, he met the Hon. Dorothy Brett, an impoverished British aristocrat and painter, who in 1941 sold him nine paintings for $580. He later invited the 70-year-old Brett (as she was known) to return to Britain and reside at West Dean, but she declined.

== Las Pozas ==
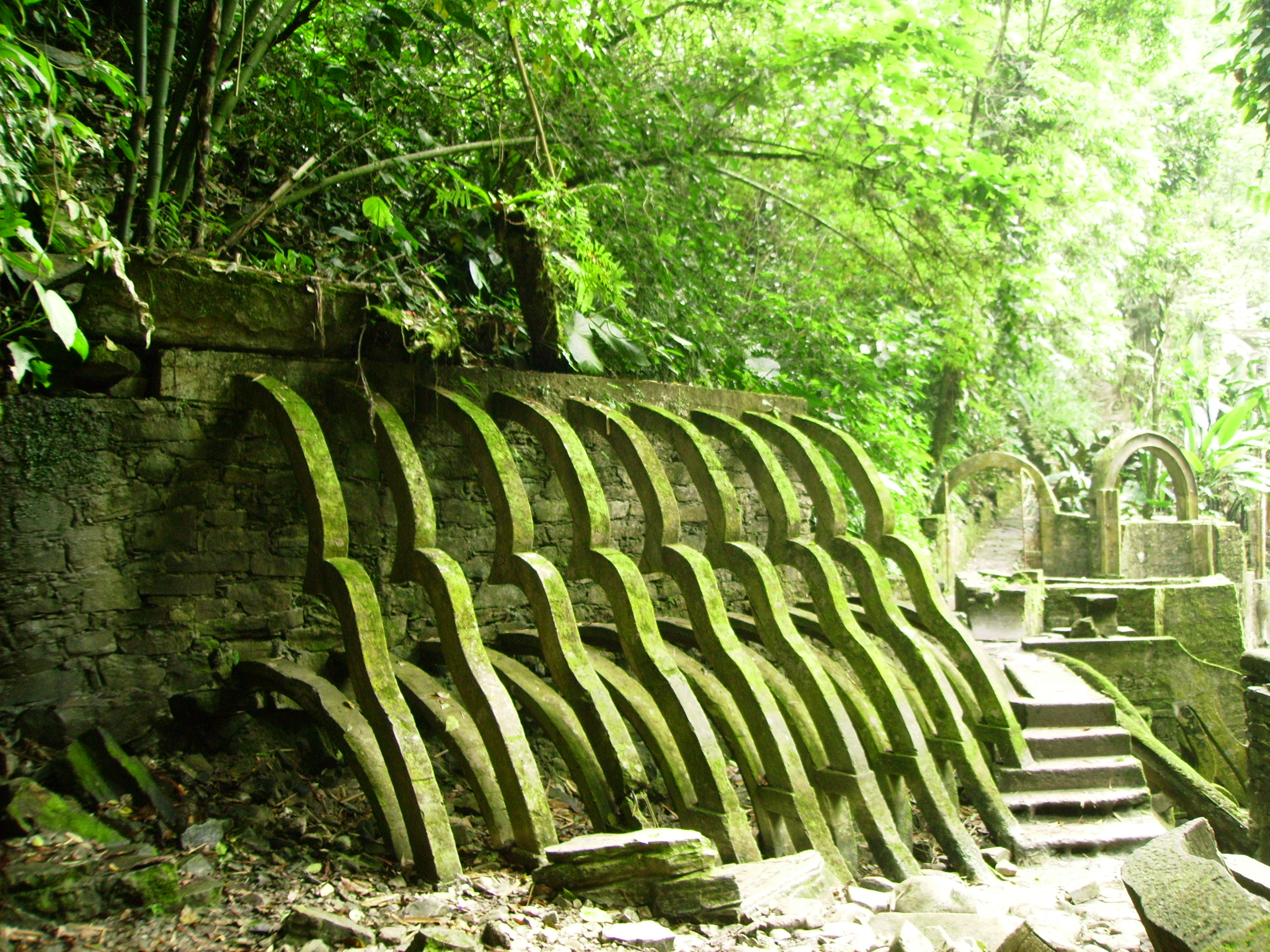
The surrealist sculpture park Las Pozas, Xilitla

Las Pozas ("the Pools") is a garden created by James near the village of Xilitla, San Luis Potosí, more than 2,000 feet (610 m) above sea level, in a subtropical rainforest in the Sierra Gorda mountains of Mexico. It includes more than 80 acres (32 ha) of natural waterfalls and pools interlaced with towering Surrealist sculptures in concrete. Massive sculptures up to four stories tall punctuate the site. The many trails throughout the garden site are composed of steps, ramps, bridges, and narrow winding walkways that traverse the valley walls. Construction of Las Pozas cost more than $5 million. To pay for it, James sold his collection of Surrealist art at auction.

== West Dean ==
In 1964, James gave his English estate, which included West Dean House at West Dean, to a charitable trust. The Edward James Foundation comprises West Dean College, a centre for the preservation of traditional arts and crafts. The college offers both short courses and full-time diploma and master’s degree programs. One of only two professional tapestry weaving studios in the UK and an art gallery are housed at the 6,400-acre (26 km^{2}) estate, which is open to the public through the West Dean Gardens.

West Dean College was set up in 1971 in response to James's vision of establishing "an educational foundation where creative talents can be discovered and developed, and where one can spread culture through the teaching of crafts and the preservation of knowledge that might otherwise be destroyed or forgotten".

Edward James is buried in the St Roche's Arboretum at West Dean, with the simple inscription Edward James 1907 – 1984 Poet. The stone was carved by John Skelton.

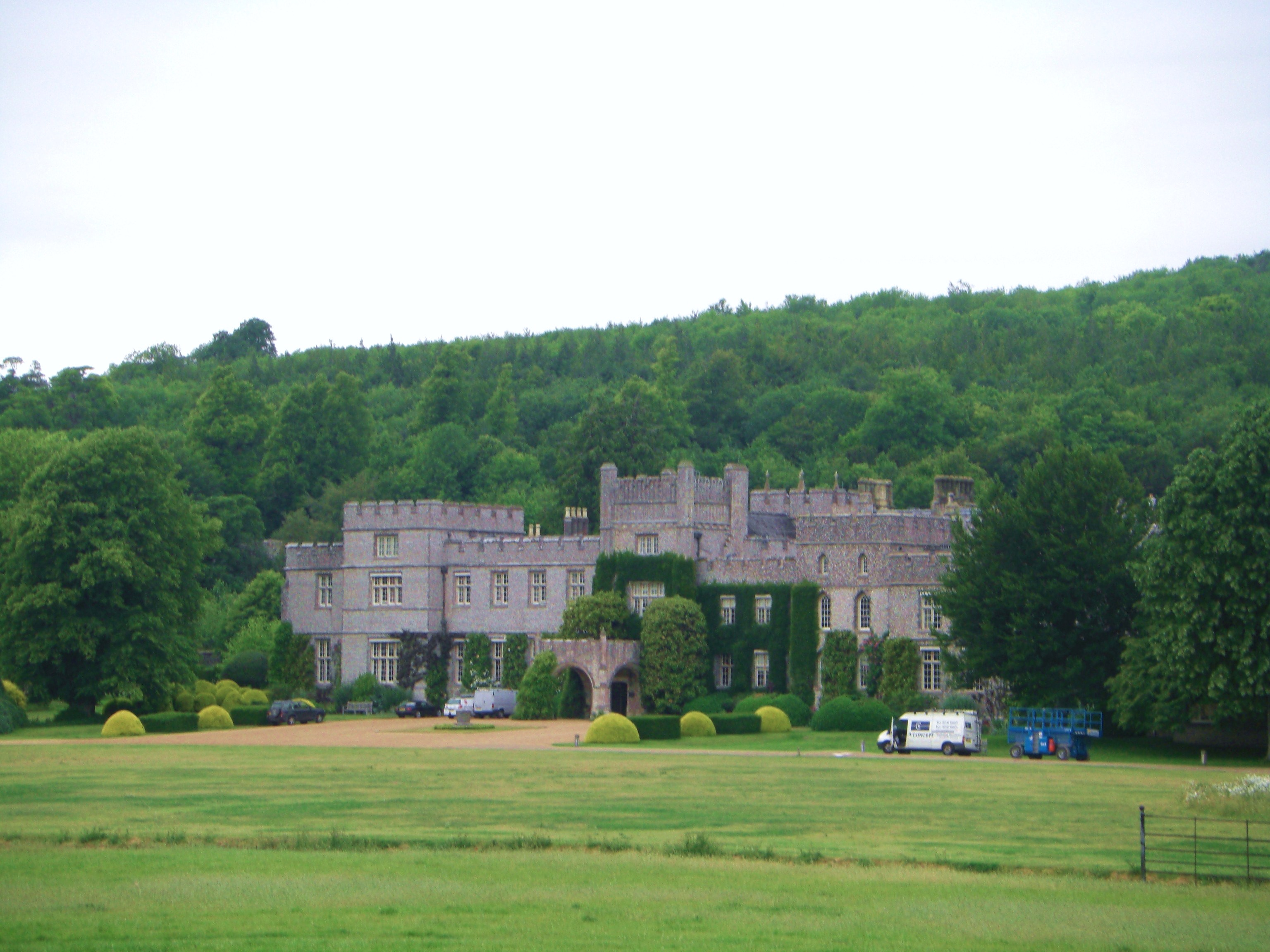
West Dean House, West Sussex, UK

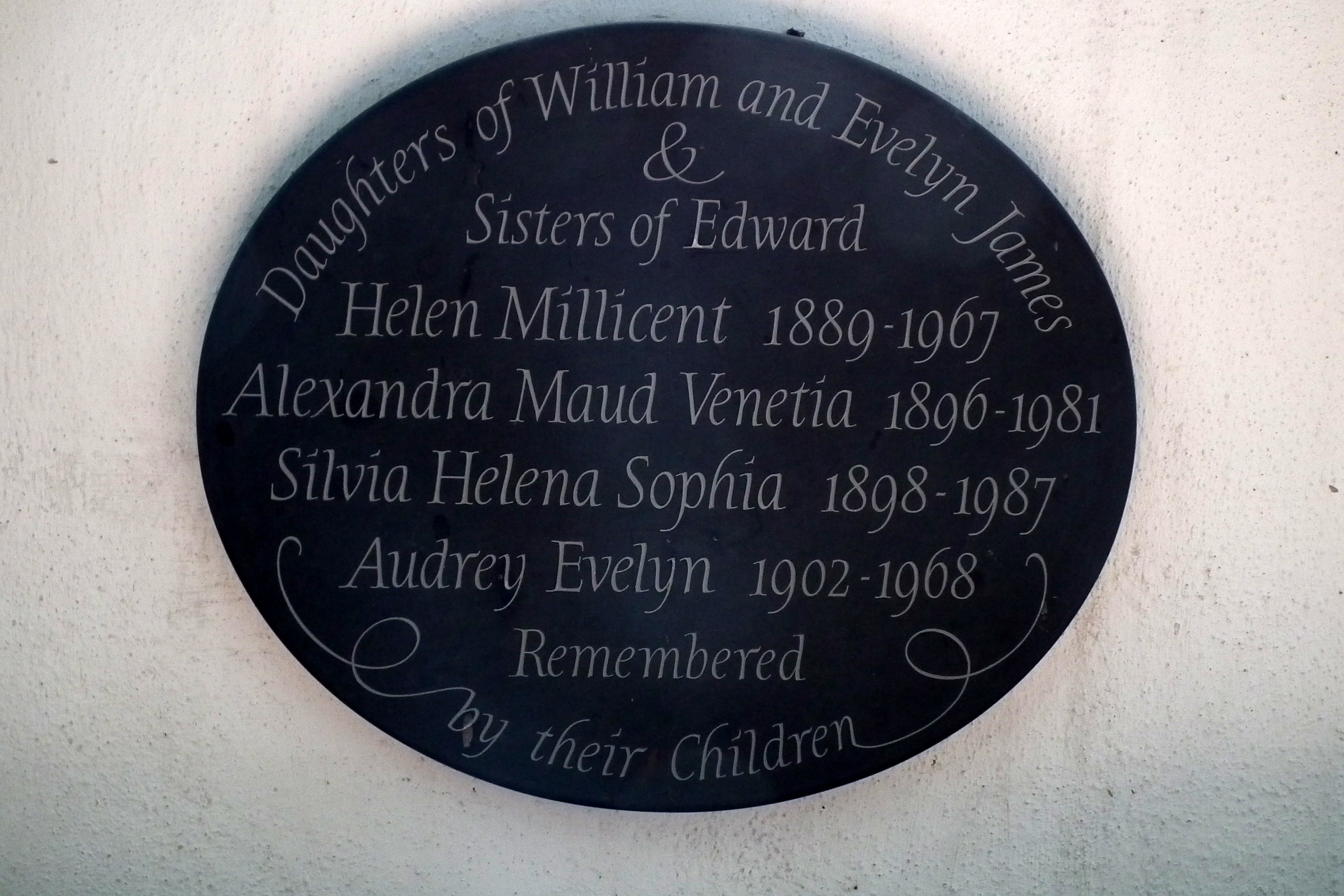
St Andrew's West Dean, West Sussex, UK

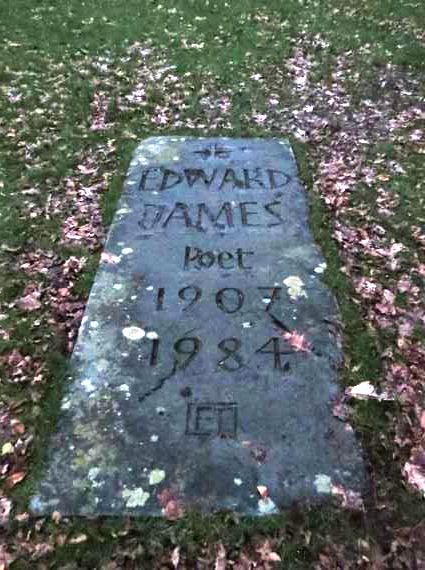
Grave of Edward James, West Dean, West Sussex, UK.

The St Roche's Arboretum at West Dean, West Sussex, UK

== Writings ==
I have seen such beauty as one man has seldom seen;
therefore will I be grateful to die in this little room,
surrounded by the forests, the great green gloom
of trees my only gloom – and the sound, the sound of green.
Here amid the warmth of the rain, what might have been
is resolved into the tenderness of a tall doom
who says: 'You did your best, rest' – and after you the bloom
of what you loved and planted still will whisper what you mean.
And the ghosts of the birds I loved, will attend me each a friend;
like them shall I have flown beyond the realm of words.
You, through the trees, shall hear them, long after the end
calling me beyond the river. For the cries of birds
continue, as – defended by the cortege of their wings –
my soul among strange silences yet sings.

—Edward James, Poet 1907 – 1984

- E. James, The Bones of my Hand, privately printed, London 1930.
- E. James, The Glass Omnibus, privately printed, London 1934.
- E. James, The Gardener Who Saw God, 1937.
- E. James, "The Sight of Marble, and Other Poems", Julian Messner (New York), 1941
- Edward James wrote a collection of four poems, Sécheresses, and Francis Poulenc set them to music for choir (mixed voices SATB) and piano or orchestra in 1937.
- — (1982). Melly, George (ed.). Swans Reflecting Elephants, My Early Years. London: Weidenfeld.

== Portrait sculpture ==
An early marble portrait sculpture of Edward James exists, by the sculptor Isamu Noguchi.

== Popular culture ==
In a video available on YouTube with the surrealist artist and singer George Melly in 1978, Edward James tells that he believed that his mother was the daughter of Albert Edward, Prince of Wales and not his lover as was widely rumoured at the time, see below.

A museum dedicated to Edward James opened its doors in Xilitla on 22 December 2022. Museo Edward James contains a collection of wooden moulds used in the construction of Las Pozas, books written by James, photographs and drawings. It also features a rare painting by James, made under the supervision of his friend, Leonora Carrington. The museum is located across the road from the sculpture garden at Las Pozas.

He was played by Aoibhinn McGinnity in the 2025 TV series This Is Not a Murder Mystery.
