= West Dean College =

College in West Sussex, England

Coordinates: 50.9062°N 0.7757°W

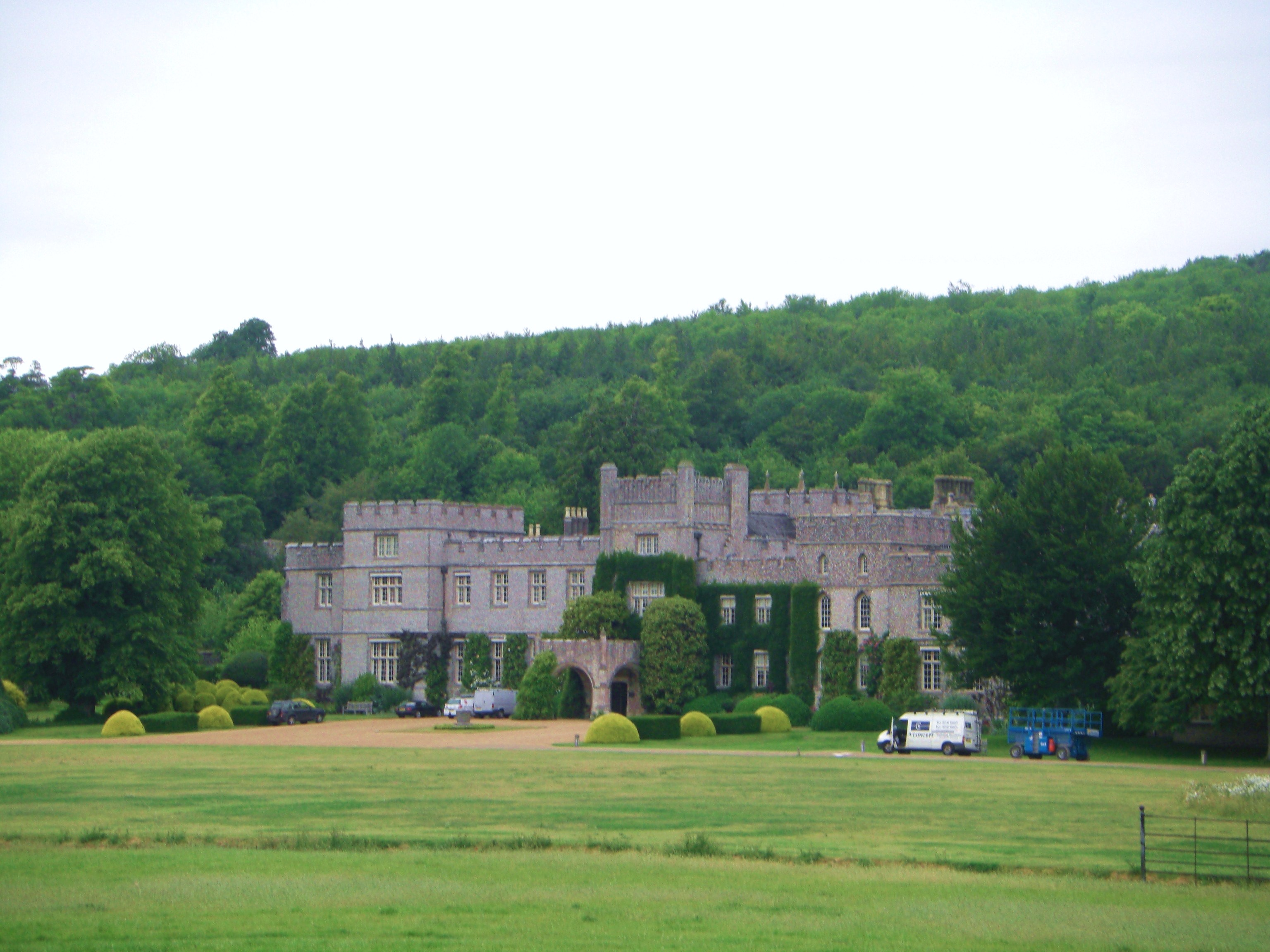
West Dean House

West Dean College is situated in the 6,350-acre (25.7 km^{2}) West Dean Estate of West Dean near Chichester. The Estate was formerly the home of the poet and patron of the arts Edward James. He was an avid admirer of the Surrealist movement, and formed one of the largest collections of their works during his lifetime. He inherited West Dean House and the estate after the death of his father, William Dodge James.

In 1939 Edward wrote to Aldous Huxley, expressing his fear that after the war, certain arts, particularly the techniques of the craftsmen, would be lost. As a solution, James suggested that his Estate be set up as an educational community where the techniques of craftsmanship could be preserved and taught, whilst restoring old work and creating new art works. In 1964 James conveyed this Estate including West Dean House to the Edward James Foundation; in 1971 the Foundation established West Dean College as a centre for the study of conservation, arts, crafts, writing, gardening and music, providing both full-time and short courses. The Sussex Barn Gallery, Tapestry Studio and West Dean Gardens are also located on the Estate.

== Short courses ==
The college offers over 700 short courses a year, at various levels of experience and covering a wide range of subjects.

== Diplomas, FdAs and MAs ==
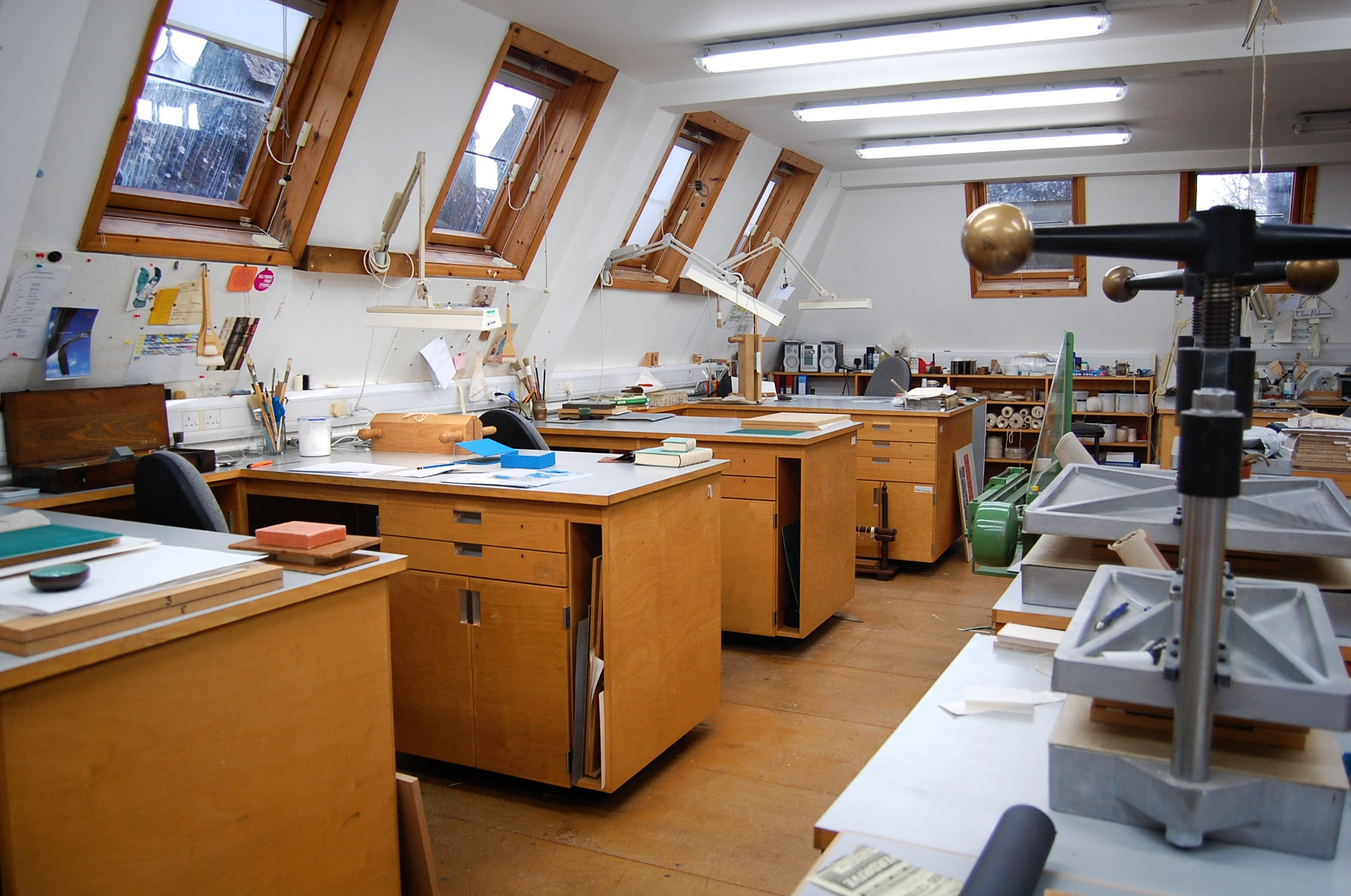
The book conservation workshop

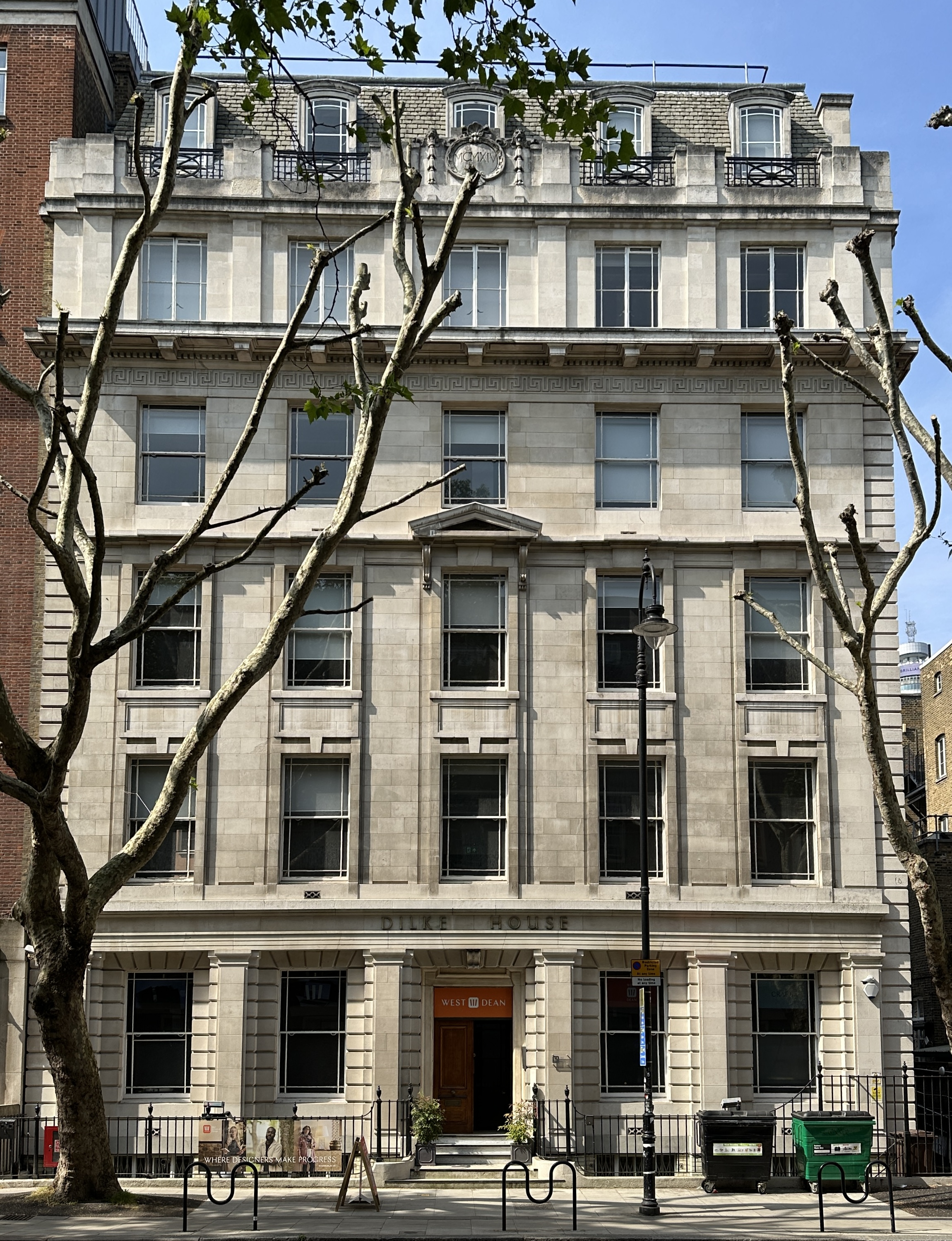
West Dean College's KLC School of Design in London

West Dean offers MA Degree and Diplomas programmes in Conservation Studies, Visual Arts and Foundation Degree (FdA) in Historic Craft Practices, validated by the University of Sussex.

The Conservation MA and Diploma can have a specialty in Conservation of Book and Library Materials, Ceramics and Related Materials, Clocks and Related Objects, Furniture and Related Objects and Metalwork.

The Visual Arts MA and Diploma is in Visual Arts, Painting and Drawing, Sculpture or Tapestry and Textile Art. Graduates include artists Pippa Blake and Tim Kent, who have gone on to exhibit their work in a variety of galleries. The college also offers Diploma courses in Making Stringed Musical Instruments.

== Tapestry Studio ==
The West Dean Tapestry Studio was established in 1974 to provide high-level craft-based programmes in woven tapestry, one of only a very small number of such studios worldwide. Their first major commission were The Henry Moore Tapestries. Tapestries woven by the studio are in the Palace of Westminster, Great Ormond Street Hospital and Chelmsford Cathedral. As well as new designs, the Studio is also engaged in recreating the 16th-century 'The Hunt of the Unicorn' tapestries, part of a twelve-year project for Historic Scotland, for the refurbishment of Stirling Castle. The Studio wove a tapestry for Tracey Emin based on her Black Cat painting; it was shown at the Saatchi Gallery in May 2011.

== Gallery ==
The Gallery on the West Dean Estate holds exhibitions of work by major outside artists as well as students and Tutors of West Dean College. Previous exhibitions include sculptor Phillip Jackson’s ‘Sacred and Profane’ in 2005, Man Ray’s ‘light and image’ in 2005 and Brazilian artist Ana Maria Pacheco’s ‘some exercise of power’ in 2006. There has also been an exhibition on ‘the interior landscape of surrealism: A glimpse into the homes of Edward James, Roland Penrose and Lee Miller’ which included the famous lobster telephone and the Mae West Lip Sofa from West Dean House, which were collaborations between Edward James and Salvador Dalí. An exhibition on the extraordinarily complex life of the model/photographer Lee Miller was also featured in the Gallery together with original works by Man Ray, Picasso and Roland Penrose.

== Music ==
In July the college holds the Chilingirian Quartet Summer School for string quartets with concerts performed by the tutors and pupils.

== Chilli Fiesta ==
Chilli Fiesta was an annual three-day festival celebrating the chilli which has been held at the college since 1995. The Fiesta features stalls, demonstrations and entertainment.

As of 2018 the Chilli Fiesta is no longer held at West Dean.

== West Dean Gardens ==
The award-winning West Dean Gardens surround the West Dean Estate in the South Downs. Head Gardener Jim Buckland and his wife Sarah Wain restored the Gardens after they suffered severe damage in the 1987 and 1990 storms. The Gardens have been awarded an English Heritage Garden Grade of II*. West Dean features a restored walled kitchen garden with 13 Victorian glasshouses. Robin Lane Fox in the Financial Times said "West Dean has a large walled kitchen garden whose standards are wonderfully high. Greenhouse after greenhouse smiles with top-class plants, fruit and rarities."

A key feature in the Gardens is the 300 ft (91 m) Edwardian pergola, designed by Harold Peto. The Arboretum has the grave to Edward James with the carved memorial stone by John Skelton (sculptor).

A visitors centre was completed in 1995. The building, which includes a gift shop and restaurant and adjoined by terraces and gardens, was designed by Christopher Alexander and colleagues. The building's exterior walls are constructed of brick, local flint, and concrete.
