= CEEC =

The acronym CEEC may refer to:

- Committee of European Economic Co-operation, a 1947 European conference on economic co-operation
- China Energy Engineering Corporation, a Chinese state-owned energy conglomerate
- Central and Eastern European Countries, a generic term for a group of European countries, usually meaning former communist states in Europe
- Communion of Evangelical Episcopal Churches, an Anglican Christian communion
- Church of England Evangelical Council, an association of mainly conservative evangelical Anglicans in the Church of England
