= Marshall Plan =

American initiative for foreign aid to Western Europe following World War II

Foreign Assistance Act of 1948
- Long title: An act to promote world peace and the general welfare, national interest, and foreign policy of the United States through economic, financial, and other measures necessary to the maintenance of conditions abroad in which free institutions may survive and consistent with the maintenance of the strength and stability of the United States.
- Enacted by: the 80th United States Congress
- Effective: April 3, 1948

Citations
- Public law: 80-472
- Statutes at Large: 62 Stat. 137

Legislative history
- Introduced in the Senate as S. 2202; Passed the Senate on March 13, 1948 (71–19); Passed the House on March 31, 1948 (333–78); Reported by the joint conference committee on April 1, 1948; agreed to by the House on April 2, 1948 (321–78) and by the Senate on April 2, 1948 (agreed); Signed into law by President Harry S. Truman on April 3, 1948

The labeling used on aid packages created and sent under the Marshall Plan

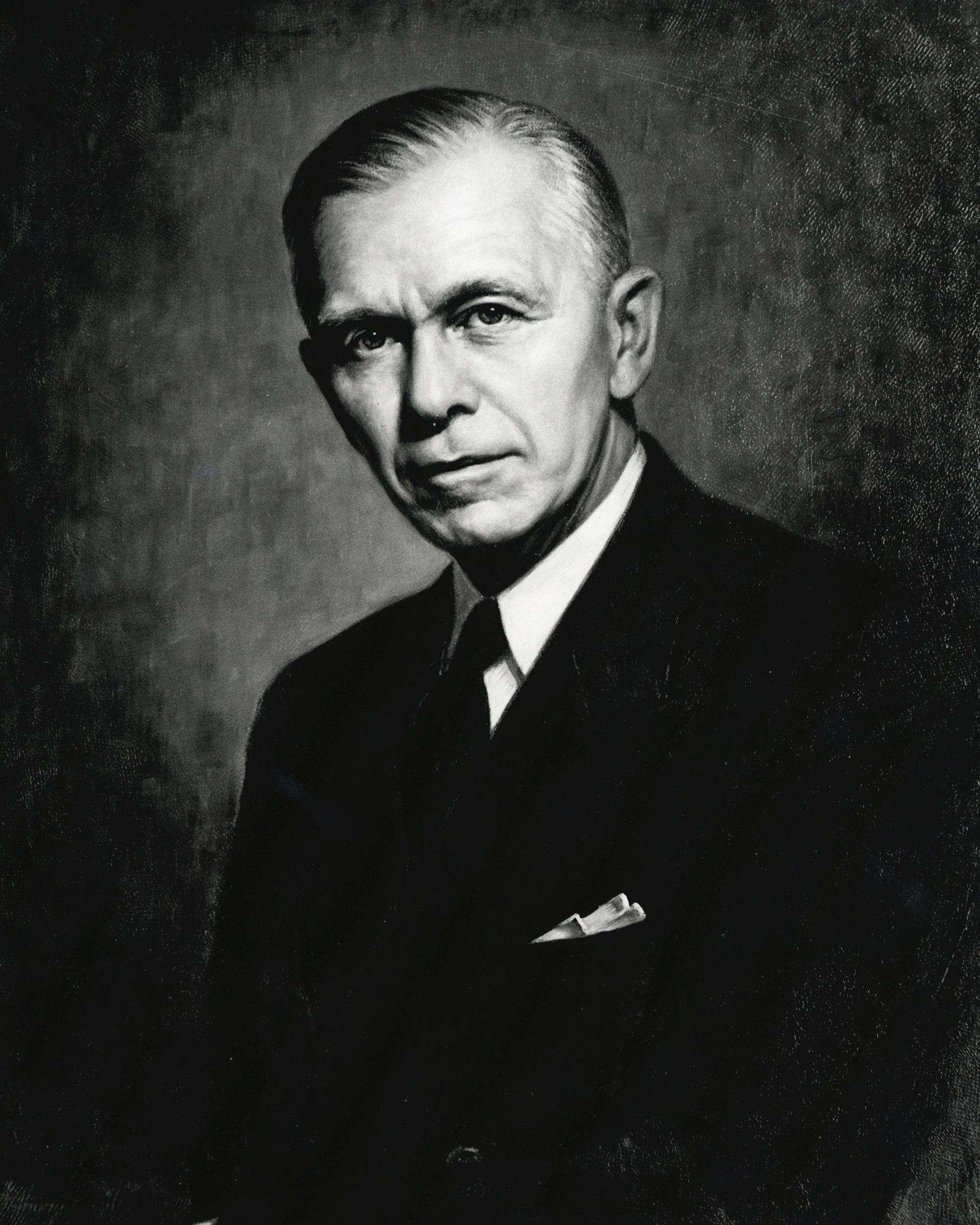
General George C. Marshall, the 50th U.S. Secretary of State

The Marshall Plan (officially the European Recovery Program, ERP) was an American initiative enacted in 1948 to provide foreign aid to Western Europe. The United States transferred US$13.3 billion to 17 European countries (equivalent to $141 billion (Note: Values for individual years taken from the row Totals for the years 1948–1952 (total: approx. 13.4 billion); for the ranges of years (1948–1949, ...) the average value of inflation was taken for the years 1948 and 1949, 1949 and 1950, etc., respectively. See (Frankenfeld 2012).) in 2025 (Note: 1634–1699: McCusker, J. J. (1997). How Much Is That in Real Money? A Historical Price Index for Use as a Deflator of Money Values in the Economy of the United States: Addenda et Corrigenda (PDF). American Antiquarian Society. 1700–1799: McCusker, J. J. (1992). How Much Is That in Real Money? A Historical Price Index for Use as a Deflator of Money Values in the Economy of the United States (PDF). American Antiquarian Society. 1800–present: Federal Reserve Bank of Minneapolis. "Consumer Price Index (estimate) 1800–".)) in economic recovery programs to Western European economies after the end of World War II in Europe. Replacing an earlier proposal for a Morgenthau Plan, it operated for four years beginning on April 3, 1948; though in 1951, the Marshall Plan was largely replaced by the Mutual Security Act. The goals of the United States were to rebuild war-torn regions, remove trade barriers, modernize industry, improve European prosperity and prevent the spread of communism. The Marshall Plan proposed the reduction of interstate barriers and the economic integration of the European continent while also encouraging an increase in productivity as well as the adoption of modern business procedures. According to a report from the U.S. Congressional Research Service, 83% of the Marshall Plan funds were spent within the United States.

The Marshall Plan aid was divided among the participating states roughly on a per capital basis. A larger amount was given to the major industrial powers, as the prevailing opinion was that their resuscitation was essential for the general European revival. Somewhat more aid per capital was also directed toward the Allied nations, with less for those that had been part of the Axis or remained neutral. The largest recipient of Marshall Plan money was the United Kingdom (receiving about 26% of the total). The next highest contributions went to France (18%) and West Germany (11%). Some eighteen European countries received Plan benefits. Although offered participation, the Soviet Union refused Plan benefits and also blocked benefits to Eastern Bloc countries, such as Romania and Poland. The United States provided similar aid programs in Asia, but they were not part of the Marshall Plan. (Note: There was large-scale American aid to Nationalist China, and North Korea, as well as French Indochina, Thailand, Burma and the Philippines. (Price 1955, pp. 179–219))

Its role in rapid recovery has been debated. The Marshall Plan's accounting reflects that aid accounted for about 3% of the combined national income of the recipient countries between 1948 and 1951, which means an increase in GDP growth of less than half a percent.

Graham T. Allison states that "the Marshall Plan has become a favorite analogy for policy-makers. Yet few know much about it." Some new studies highlight not only the role of economic cooperation but also approach the Marshall Plan as a case concerning strategic thinking to face some typical challenges in policy, such as problem definition, risk analysis, decision support to policy formulation, and program implementation.

In 1947, two years after the end of the war, industrialist Lewis H. Brown wrote, at the request of General Lucius D. Clay, A Report on Germany, which served as a detailed recommendation for the reconstruction of post-war Germany and served as a basis for the Marshall Plan. The initiative was named after United States secretary of state George C. Marshall. The plan had bipartisan support in Washington, where the Republicans controlled Congress and the Democrats controlled the White House with Harry S. Truman as president. Some businessmen feared the Marshall Plan, unsure whether reconstructing European economies and encouraging foreign competition was in the US' best interests. The plan was largely the creation of State Department officials, especially William L. Clayton and George F. Kennan, with help from the Brookings Institution, as requested by Senator Arthur Vandenberg, chairman of the United States Senate Committee on Foreign Relations. Marshall spoke of an urgent need to help the European recovery in his address at Harvard University in June 1947. The purpose of the Marshall Plan was to aid in the economic recovery of nations after World War II and secure US geopolitical influence over Western Europe. To combat the effects of the Marshall Plan, the USSR developed its own economic recovery program, known as the Molotov Plan.

The phrase "equivalent of the Marshall Plan" is often used to describe a proposed large-scale economic rescue program.

== Development and deployment ==
The reconstruction plan which was developed at a meeting of the participating European states, was officially drafted on June 5, 1947. It offered the same aid to the Soviet Union and its allies, but they refused to accept it, under Soviet pressure (as was the case for Finland's rejection), as doing so would allow a degree of US control over the communist economies. Secretary Marshall became convinced Stalin had no interest in helping restore economic health in Western Europe.

European Recovery Program expenditures by country. The Eastern Bloc is not included.

President Harry Truman signed the Marshall Plan on April 3, 1948, granting $5 billion in aid to 16 European nations. During the four years that the plan was in effect, the United States donated $17 billion (equivalent to $254.61 billion in 2025) in economic and technical assistance to help the recovery of the European countries that joined the Organisation for European Economic Co-operation. The $17 billion was in the context of a US GDP of $258 billion in 1948, and on top of $17 billion in American aid to Europe between the end of the war and the start of the plan that is counted separately from the Marshall Plan. The Marshall Plan was replaced by the Mutual Security Plan at the end of 1951; that new plan gave away about $7.5 billion annually until 1961 when it was replaced by another program.

The ERP addressed each of the obstacles to postwar recovery. The plan looked to the future and did not focus on the destruction caused by the war. Much more important were efforts to modernize European industrial and business practices using high-efficiency American models, reducing artificial trade barriers, and instilling a sense of hope and self-reliance.

By 1952, as the funding ended, the economy of every participant state had surpassed pre-war levels; for all Marshall Plan recipients, output in 1951 was at least 35% higher than in 1938. (Note: West Germany was 6% higher, the other countries 45% higher (Eichengreen 2008, p. 57).) Over the next two decades, Western Europe enjoyed unprecedented growth and prosperity, but economists are not sure what proportion was due directly to the ERP, what proportion indirectly, and how much would have happened without it. A common American interpretation of the program's role in European recovery was expressed by Paul Hoffman, head of the Economic Cooperation Administration, in 1949 when he told Congress Marshall aid had provided the "critical margin" on which other investment needed for European recovery depended. The Marshall Plan was one of the first elements of European integration, as it erased trade barriers and set up institutions to coordinate the economy on a continental level—that is, it stimulated the total political reconstruction of Western Europe.

Belgian economic historian Herman Van der Wee concludes the Marshall Plan was a "great success":

It gave a new impetus to reconstruction in Western Europe and made a decisive contribution to the renewal of the transport system, the modernization of industrial and agricultural equipment, the resumption of normal production, the raising of productivity, and the facilitating of intra-European trade.

== Wartime destruction ==
By the end of World War II, much of Europe was devastated. Sustained aerial bombardment during the war had badly damaged most major cities, and industrial facilities were especially hard-hit. The region's trade flows had been thoroughly disrupted, with millions of refugees in temporary camps living on aid from the United States, which was provided by the United Nations Relief and Rehabilitation Administration and other agencies. Food shortages were severe, especially in the harsh winter of 1946–47. From July 1945 through June 1946, the United States shipped 16.5 million tons of food, primarily wheat, to Europe and Japan. It amounted to one-sixth of the American food supply and provided 35 trillion calories, enough to provide 400 calories a day for one year to 300 million people.

Especially damaged was transportation infrastructure, as railways, bridges, and docks had been specifically targeted by airstrikes, while much merchant shipping had been sunk. Although most small towns and villages had not suffered as much damage, the destruction of transportation left them economically isolated. None of these problems could be easily remedied, as most nations engaged in the war had exhausted their treasuries in the process.

The only major powers whose infrastructure had not been significantly harmed in World War II were the United States and Canada. They were much more prosperous than before the war, but exports were a small factor in their economy. Much of the Marshall Plan aid would be used by the Europeans to buy manufactured goods and raw materials from the United States and Canada.

== Initial post-war events ==
=== Slow recovery ===
Most of Europe's economies were recovering slowly, as unemployment and food shortages led to strikes and unrest in several nations. Agricultural production was 83% of 1938 levels, industrial production was 88%, and exports 59%. Exceptions were the United Kingdom, the Netherlands and France, where by the end of 1947 production had already been restored to pre-war levels before the Marshall Plan. Italy and Belgium would follow by the end of 1948.

In Germany in 1945–46, housing and food conditions were bad, as the disruption of transport, markets, and finances slowed a return to normality. In the West, the bombing had destroyed 5,000,000 houses and apartments, and 12,000,000 refugees from the east had crowded in. The split of Germany into zones also interrupted food supplies within the country, leading to a drop from 80% self-sufficiency in food production for all of pre-war Germany to 50% in the western zones at pre-war production levels. On top of that reduction, the food production in the western zones was 30% below pre-war levels in 1946–48.

The drop in food production across Europe can also be attributed to a drought that killed a major portion of the wheat crop while a severe winter destroyed most of the wheat crop the following year (see also Soviet famine of 1946–1947, Winter of 1946–47 in the United Kingdom). This caused most Europeans to rely on a 1,500-calorie-per-day diet or less.

Industrial production fell more than half and reached pre-war levels at the end of 1949. While Germany struggled to recover from the destruction of the War, the recovery effort began in June 1948, moving on from emergency relief. The currency reform in 1948 was headed by the military government and helped Germany to restore stability by encouraging production. The reform revalued old currency and deposits and introduced a new currency. Taxes were also reduced and Germany prepared to remove economic barriers.

During the first three years of occupation of Germany, the Allied occupational authorities vigorously pursued a military disarmament program in Germany, partly by removal of equipment but mainly through an import embargo on raw materials, part of the Morgenthau Plan approved by President Franklin D. Roosevelt. Historian Nicholas Balabkins concluded that "as long as German industrial capacity was kept idle the economic recovery of Europe was delayed." By July 1947, Washington realized that economic recovery in Europe could not go forward without the reconstruction of the German industrial base, deciding that an "orderly, prosperous Europe requires the economic contributions of a stable and productive Germany." In addition, the strength of Moscow-controlled communist parties in France and Italy worried Washington.

In the view of the State Department under President Harry S. Truman, the United States needed to adopt a definite position on the world scene or fear losing credibility. The emerging doctrine of containment (as opposed to rollback) argued that the United States needed to substantially aid non-communist countries to stop the spread of Soviet influence. There was also some hope that the Eastern Bloc nations would join the plan, and thus be pulled out of the emerging Soviet bloc, but that did not happen.

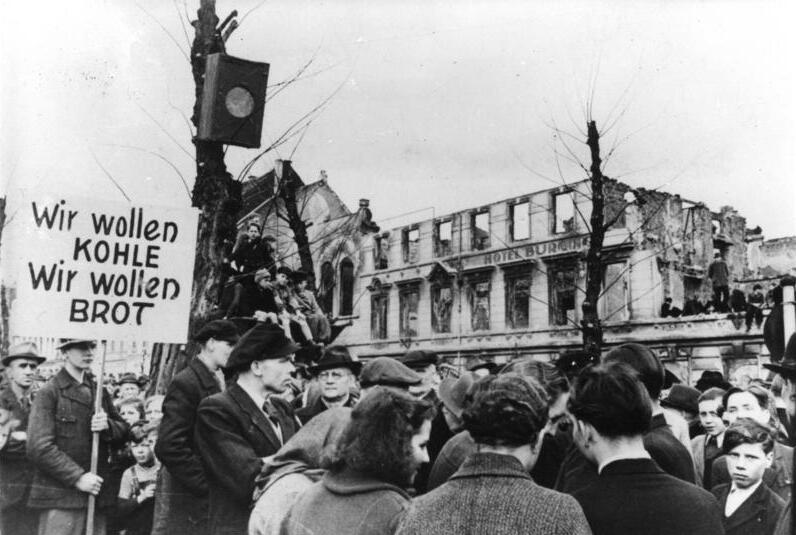
The hunger-winter of 1947. Thousands protest in West Germany against the disastrous food situation (March 31, 1947). The sign says: We want coal, we want bread

==== Need to rebuild Germany ====
In January 1947, Truman appointed retired General George Marshall as Secretary of State. In July 1947, Marshall scrapped Joint Chiefs of Staff Directive 1067, which was based on the Morgenthau Plan that had decreed "take no steps looking toward the economic rehabilitation of Germany [or] designed to maintain or strengthen the German economy." The new plan JCS 1779 stated that "an orderly and prosperous Europe requires the economic contributions of a stable and productive Germany." The restrictions placed on German heavy industry production were partly ameliorated; permitted steel production levels were raised from 25% of pre-war capacity to a new limit placed at 50% of pre-war capacity.

With a communist, although non-Soviet, insurgency in progress in Greece, and Britain financially unable to continue its aid, the President announced his Truman Doctrine on March 12, 1947, "to support free peoples who are resisting attempted subjugation by armed minorities or by outside pressures", with an aid request for consideration and decision, concerning Greece and Turkey. Herbert Hoover noted that "The whole economy of Europe is interlinked with the German economy through the exchange of raw materials and manufactured goods. The productivity of Europe cannot be restored without the restoration of Germany as a contributor to that productivity." Hoover's report led to a realization in Washington that a new policy was needed; "almost any action would be an improvement on current policy." In Washington, the Joint Chiefs declared that the "complete revival of German industry, particularly coal mining" was now of "primary importance" to American security.

The United States was already spending a great deal to help Europe recover. Over $14 billion was spent or loaned during the postwar period through the end of 1947 and is not counted as part of the Marshall Plan. Much of this aid was designed to restore infrastructure and help refugees. Britain, for example, received an emergency loan of $3.75 billion.

The United Nations also launched a series of humanitarian and relief efforts almost wholly funded by the United States. These efforts had important effects, but they lacked any central organization and planning, and failed to meet many of Europe's more fundamental needs. Already in 1943, the United Nations Relief and Rehabilitation Administration (UNRRA) was founded to provide relief to areas liberated from Germany. UNRRA provided billions of dollars of rehabilitation aid and helped about 8 million refugees. It ceased the operation of displaced persons camps in Europe in 1947; many of its functions were transferred to several UN agencies.

== Soviet negotiations ==
After Marshall's appointment in January 1947, administration officials met with Soviet Foreign Minister Vyacheslav Molotov and others to press for an economically self-sufficient Germany, including a detailed accounting of the industrial plants, goods and infrastructure already removed by the Soviets in their occupied zone. Molotov refrained from supplying accounts of Soviet assets. The Soviets took a punitive approach, pressing for a delay rather than an acceleration in economic rehabilitation, demanding unconditional fulfillment of all prior reparation claims, and pressing for progress toward nationwide socioeconomic transformation.

After six weeks of negotiations, Molotov rejected all of the American and British proposals. During negotiations with the French and the British, Molotov received a ciphered telegram from Vyshinsky, Soviet Minister of Foreign Affairs. The official position of the Soviet Union, on Stalin's orders, had changed dramatically, and now Moscow's representatives in Paris were forcefully rejecting the Marshall Plan. Due to this change, Molotov rejected the counteroffer to scrap the British-American "Bizonia" and to include the Soviet zone within the newly constructed Germany. Marshall was particularly discouraged after personally meeting with Stalin to explain that the United States could not possibly abandon its position on Germany, while Stalin expressed little interest in a solution to German economic problems.

== Marshall's speech ==
After the adjournment of the Moscow conference following six weeks of failed discussions with the Soviets regarding a potential German reconstruction, the United States concluded that a solution could not wait any longer. To clarify the American position, a major address by Secretary of State George Marshall was planned. Marshall gave the address at Harvard University on June 5, 1947. He offered American aid to promote European recovery and reconstruction. The speech described the dysfunction of the European economy and presented a rationale for US aid:

The modern system of the division of labor upon which the exchange of products is based is in danger of breaking down. ... Aside from the demoralizing effect on the world at large and the possibilities of disturbances arising as a result of the desperation of the people concerned, the consequences to the economy of the United States should be apparent to all. It is logical that the United States should do whatever it is able to do to assist in the return of normal economic health to the world, without which there can be no political stability and no assured peace. Our policy is not directed against any country, but against hunger, poverty, desperation and chaos. Any government that is willing to assist in recovery will find full co-operation on the part of the United States. Its purpose should be the revival of a working economy in the world so as to permit the emergence of political and social conditions in which free institutions can exist.

Marshall was convinced that economic stability would provide political stability in Europe. He offered aid, but the European countries had to organize the program themselves.

The speech, written at Marshall's request and guidance by Charles Bohlen contained virtually no details and no numbers. More a proposal than a plan, it was a challenge to European leaders to cooperate and coordinate. It asked Europeans to create their own plan for rebuilding Europe, indicating the United States would then fund this plan. The administration felt that the plan would likely be unpopular among many Americans, and the speech was mainly directed at a European audience. In an attempt to keep the speech out of American papers, journalists were not contacted, and on the same day, Truman called a press conference to take away headlines. In contrast, Dean Acheson, an Under Secretary of State, was dispatched to contact the European media, especially the British media, and the speech was read in its entirety on the BBC.

In the audience at Harvard was International Law and Diplomacy graduate student Malcolm Crawford, who had just written his Master's thesis entitled "A Blueprint for the Financing of Post-War Business and Industry in the United Kingdom and Republic of France". Crawford's thesis was read by future Supreme Court Justice Abe Fortas and presented to President Truman as the solution for Marshall's proposal. It was Crawford's thesis which provided the key to selling the Marshall Plan to Congress by laying out the idea of "strategic partnerships". Instead of the Federal government granting money directly to Europe, American businesses would provide technology, expertise, and materials to Europe as a strategic partner, and in exchange, the Federal government would purchase stock in the US businesses to reimburse them. In this way, Europe would receive the aid it needed, American businesses would receive capital investment, and the federal government would make a profit when the stock was sold.

== Rejection by Stalin ==
British Foreign Secretary Ernest Bevin heard Marshall's radio broadcast speech and immediately contacted French Foreign Minister Georges Bidault to begin preparing a quick European response to (and acceptance of) the offer, which led to the creation of the Committee of European Economic Co-operation. The two agreed that it would be necessary to invite the Soviets as the other major allied power. Marshall's speech had explicitly included an invitation to the Soviets, feeling that excluding them would have been a sign of distrust. State Department officials, however, knew that Stalin would almost certainly not participate and that any plan that would send large amounts of aid to the Soviets was unlikely to get Congressional approval.

=== Initial reactions ===
Speaking at the Paris Peace Conference on October 10, 1946, Molotov had already stated Soviet fears: "If American capital was given a free hand in the small states ruined and enfeebled by the war [it] would buy up the local industries, appropriate the more attractive Romanian, Yugoslav ... enterprises and would become the master in these small states." While the Soviet ambassador in Washington suspected that the Marshall Plan could lead to the creation of an anti-Soviet bloc, Stalin was open to the offer. He directed that—in negotiations to be held in Paris regarding the aid—countries in the Eastern Bloc should not reject economic conditions being placed upon them. Stalin only changed his outlook when he learned that (a) credit would only be extended under conditions of economic cooperation, and (b) aid would also be extended to Germany in total, an eventuality which Stalin thought would hamper the Soviets' ability to exercise influence in western Germany.

Initially, Stalin maneuvered to kill the plan, or at least hamper it using destructive participation in the Paris talks regarding conditions. He quickly realized, however, that this would be impossible after Molotov reported—following his arrival in Paris in July 1947—that conditions for the credit were non-negotiable. Looming as just as large a concern was the Czechoslovak eagerness to accept the aid, as well as indications of a similar Polish attitude.

=== Compulsory Eastern Bloc rejection ===
Soviet Foreign Minister Vyacheslav Molotov left Paris, rejecting the plan. After that, statements were made suggesting a future confrontation with the West, calling the United States both a "fascizing" power and the "center of worldwide reaction and anti-Soviet activity", with all U.S.-aligned countries branded as enemies. The Soviets blamed the United States for communist losses in elections in Belgium, France, and Italy months earlier, in the spring of 1947. It claimed that "marshallization" must be resisted and prevented by any means and that French and Italian communist parties were to make maximum efforts to sabotage the implementation of the plan. In addition, Western embassies in Moscow were isolated, with their personnel being denied contact with Soviet officials.

On July 12, a larger meeting was convened in Paris. Every country in Europe was invited, with the exceptions of Spain (a World War II neutral that had sympathized with the Axis powers) and the small states of Andorra, San Marino, Monaco, and Liechtenstein. The Soviet Union was invited with the understanding that it would likely refuse. The states of the future Eastern Bloc were also approached, and Czechoslovakia and Poland agreed to attend. In one of the most evident signs and reflections of tight Soviet control and domination over the region, Jan Masaryk, the foreign minister of Czechoslovakia, was summoned to Moscow and berated by Stalin for considering Czechoslovakia's possible involvement with and joining of the Marshall Plan. The prime minister of Poland, Józef Cyrankiewicz, was rewarded by Stalin for his country's rejection of the plan which came in the form of the Soviet Union's offer of a lucrative trade agreement lasting for five years, a grant amounting to the approximate equivalent of US$450M (in 1948; the sum would have been US$4.4B in 2014) in the form of long-term credit and loans and the provision of 200,000 tonnes of grain, heavy and manufacturing machinery and factories and heavy industries to Poland.

The Marshall Plan participants were not surprised when the Czechoslovak and Polish delegations were prevented from attending the Paris meeting. The other Eastern Bloc states immediately rejected the offer. Finland also declined, to avoid antagonizing the Soviets (see also Finlandization). The Soviet Union's "alternative" to the Marshall plan which was purported to involve Soviet subsidies and trade with Western Europe, became known as the Molotov Plan, and later, the Comecon. In a 1947 speech to the United Nations, Soviet deputy foreign minister Andrei Vyshinsky said that the Marshall Plan violated the principles of the United Nations. He accused the United States of attempting to impose its will on other independent states while at the same time using economic resources distributed as a relief to needy nations as an instrument of political pressure. John Gunther wrote in 1949 that Eastern Bloc leaders sincerely believed that the United States would soon attack, and that the Marshall Plan was part of its aggression. "You cannot kill ideas by dollars" was a typical retort.

=== Yugoslavia ===
Yugoslavia, led by Josip Broz (Tito), initially went along with all the other communist European countries in rejecting the Marshall Plan. However, in 1948 Tito broke decisively with Stalin on other issues. Yugoslavia requested US aid. US leaders were internally divided, but finally agreed and began sending money on a small scale in 1949 and on a much larger scale in 1950–53. The US aid was not part of the Marshall Plan.

=== Szklarska Poręba meeting ===
In late September, the Soviet Union called a meeting of nine European communist parties at the resort town of Szklarska Poręba in southwest Poland. A Communist Party of the Soviet Union (CPSU) report was read at the outset to set the heavily anti-Western tone, stating now that "international politics is dominated by the ruling clique of the American imperialists" which have embarked upon the "enslavement of the weakened capitalist countries of Europe".Communist parties were to struggle against the US presence in Europe by any means necessary, including sabotage. The report further claimed that "reactionary imperialist elements throughout the world, particularly in the United States, in Britain and France, had put particular hope on Germany and Japan, primarily on Hitlerite Germany—first as a force most capable of striking a blow at the Soviet Union".

Referring to the Eastern Bloc, the report stated that "the Red Army's liberating role was complemented by an upsurge of the freedom-loving peoples' liberation struggle against the fascist predators and their hirelings."It argued that "the bosses of Wall Street" were "tak[ing] the place of Germany, Japan, and Italy". The Marshall Plan was described as "the American plan for the enslavement of Europe". It described the world now breaking down "into basically two camps—the imperialist and antidemocratic camp on the one hand, and the anti-imperialist and democratic camp on the other".

Although the Eastern Bloc countries, except Czechoslovakia, had immediately rejected Marshall Plan aid, Eastern Bloc communist parties were blamed for permitting even minor influence by non-communists in their respective countries during the run-up to the Marshall Plan. The meeting's chair, Andrei Zhdanov, who was in permanent radio contact with the Kremlin from whom he received instructions, also castigated communist parties in France and Italy for collaboration with those countries' domestic agendas. Zhdanov warned that if they continued to fail to maintain international contact with Moscow to consult on all matters, "extremely harmful consequences for the development of the brother parties' work" would result.

Party rules prevented Italian and French communist leaders from pointing out that it was Stalin who had directed them not to take opposition stances in 1944. The French communist party, like others, was then to redirect its mission to "destroy capitalist economy" and that the Soviet Communist Information Bureau (Cominform) would take control of the French Communist Party's activities to oppose the Marshall Plan. When they asked Zhdanov if they should prepare for armed revolt when they returned home, he did not answer. In a follow-up conversation with Stalin, he explained that an armed struggle would be impossible and that the struggle against the Marshall Plan was to be waged under the slogan of national independence.

== Passage in Congress ==
Congress, under the control of conservative Republicans, agreed to the program for multiple reasons. The 20-member conservative isolationist Senate wing of the party, based in the rural Midwest and led by Senator Kenneth S. Wherry (R-Nebraska), was outmaneuvered by the emerging internationalist wing, led by Senator Arthur H. Vandenberg (R-Michigan). The opposition argued that it made no sense to oppose communism by supporting the socialist governments in Western Europe; and that US goods would reach Russia and increase its war potential. They called it "a wasteful 'operation rat-hole'" Vandenberg, assisted by Senator Henry Cabot Lodge Jr. (R-Massachusetts) admitted there was no certainty that the plan would succeed, but said it would halt economic chaos, sustain Western civilization, and stop further Soviet expansion. Senator Robert A. Taft (R-Ohio) hedged on the issue. He said it was without economic justification; however, it was "absolutely necessary" in "the world battle against communism". In the end, only 17 senators voted against it on March 13, 1948. A bill granting an initial $5 billion passed Congress with strong bipartisan support. Congress eventually allocated $12.4 billion in aid over the four years of the plan.

Congress reflected public opinion, which resonated with the ideological argument that communism flourishes in poverty. Across the US, multiple interest groups, including business, labor, farming, philanthropy, ethnic groups, and religious groups, saw the Marshall Plan as an inexpensive solution to a massive problem, noting it would also help US exports and stimulate its own economy as well. Major newspapers were highly supportive, including such conservative outlets as Time magazine. Vandenberg made sure of bipartisan support on the Senate Foreign Relations Committee. The Solid Democratic South was highly supportive, the upper Midwest was dubious, but heavily outnumbered. The plan was opposed by conservatives in the rural Midwest, who opposed any major government spending program and were highly suspicious of Europeans. The plan also had some opponents on the left, led by Henry A. Wallace, the former vice president. He said the plan was hostile to the Soviet Union, a subsidy for American exporters, and sure to polarize the world between East and West. However, opposition against the Marshall Plan was greatly reduced by the shock of the communist coup in Czechoslovakia in February 1948. The appointment of the prominent businessman Paul G. Hoffman as director reassured conservative businessmen that the gigantic sums of money would be handled efficiently.

== Negotiations ==
Turning the plan into reality required negotiations among the participating nations. Sixteen nations met in Paris to determine what form the US aid would take, and how it would be divided. The negotiations were long and complex, with each nation having its own interests. France's major concern was that Germany not be rebuilt to its previous level of might. The Benelux countries (Belgium, Netherlands, and Luxembourg), despite also suffering under the Nazis, had long been closely linked to the German economy and felt their prosperity depended on its revival. The Scandinavian nations, especially Sweden, insisted that their long-standing trading relationships with the Eastern Bloc nations not be disrupted and that their neutrality not be infringed.

The United Kingdom insisted on special status as a longstanding belligerent during the war, concerned that if it were treated equally with the devastated continental powers, it would receive virtually no aid. The Americans were pushing the importance of free trade and European unity to form a bulwark against communism. The Truman administration, represented by William L. Clayton, promised the Europeans that they would be free to structure the plan themselves, but the administration also reminded the Europeans that implementation depended on the plan's passage through Congress. A majority of Congress members were committed to free trade and European integration and were hesitant to spend too much of the money on Germany. However, before the Marshall Plan was in effect, France, Austria, and Italy needed immediate aid. On December 17, 1947, the United States agreed to give US$40M to France, Austria, China, and Italy.

Agreement was eventually reached, and the Europeans sent a reconstruction plan to Washington, which was formulated and agreed upon by the Committee of European Economic Co-operation in 1947. In the document, the Europeans asked for $22 billion in aid. Truman cut this to $17 billion in the bill he put to Congress. On March 17, 1948, Truman addressed European security and condemned the Soviet Union before a hastily convened Joint Session of Congress. Attempting to contain spreading Soviet influence in the Eastern Bloc, Truman asked Congress to restore a peacetime military draft and to swiftly pass the Economic Cooperation Act, the name given to the Marshall Plan. Of the Soviet Union Truman said, "The situation in the world today is not primarily the result of the natural difficulties which follow a great war. It is chiefly due to the fact that one nation has not only refused to cooperate in the establishment of a just and honorable peace but—even worse—has actively sought to prevent it.

Members of the Republican-controlled 80th Congress (1947–1949) were skeptical. "In effect, he told the Nation that we have lost the peace, that our whole war effort was in vain.", noted Representative Frederick Smith of Ohio. Others thought he had not been forceful enough to contain the USSR. "What [Truman] said fell short of being tough", noted Representative Eugene Cox, a Democrat from the state of Georgia, "there is no prospect of ever winning Russian cooperation." Despite its reservations, the 80th Congress implemented Truman's requests, further escalating the Cold War with the USSR.

Truman signed the Economic Cooperation Act into law on April 3, 1948; the Act established the Economic Cooperation Administration (ECA) to administer the program. ECA was headed by economic cooperation administrator Paul G. Hoffman. In the same year, the participating countries (Austria, Belgium, Denmark, France, West Germany, the United Kingdom, Greece, Iceland, Ireland, Italy, Luxembourg, the Netherlands, Norway, Sweden, Switzerland, Turkey, and the United States) signed an accord establishing a master financial-aid-coordinating agency, the Organisation for European Economic Co-operation (later called the Organisation for Economic Co-operation and Development or OECD), which was headed by Frenchman Robert Marjolin.

== Implementation ==
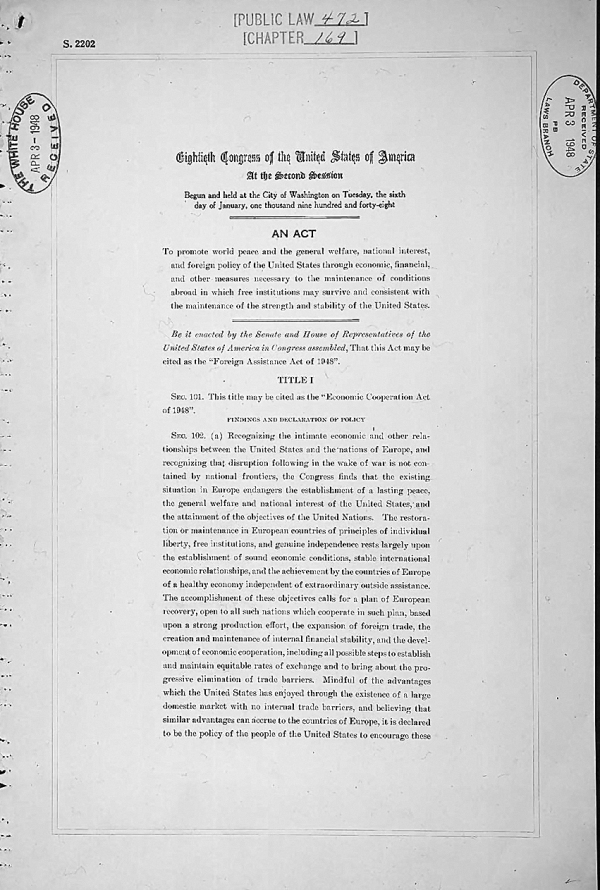
First page of the Marshall Plan

According to Armin Grünbacher:

The U.S. government did not give money directly to the participating countries so that they could buy whatever they thought they needed. Instead the U.S. delivered the goods and provided services, mainly transatlantic shipping, to the participating governments, which then sold the commodities to businesses and individuals who had to pay the dollar value of the goods in local currency ("counterparts") into so-called ERP Special Accounts that were set up at the country's central bank. This way of operation held three advantages: the provision of U.S. goods to Europe without European dollar payments helped to narrow the dollar gap that strangled European reconstruction; the accumulated funds could be used for investments in long-term reconstruction (as happened in France and Germany) or for paying off a government's war debts (as in Great Britain); and the payments of the goods in local currencies helped to limit inflation by taking these funds temporarily out of circulation while they were held in the Special Accounts.

The ECA's official mission statement was to give a boost to the European economy: to promote European production, to bolster European currency, and to facilitate international trade, especially with the United States, whose economic interest required Europe to become wealthy enough to import US goods. Another unofficial goal of ECA (and of the Marshall Plan) was the containment of growing Soviet influence in Europe, evident especially in the growing strength of communist parties in France and Italy.

The Marshall Plan money was transferred to the governments of the European nations. The funds were jointly administered by the local governments and the ECA. Each European capital had an ECA envoy, generally a prominent American businessman who would advise on the process. The cooperative allocation of funds was encouraged, and panels of government, business and labor leaders were convened to examine the economy and see where aid was needed. The recipient nations were represented collectively by the Organisation for Economic Co-operation and Development (OECD), headed by British statesman Oliver Franks.

The Marshall Plan aid was mostly used for goods from the United States. The European nations had all but exhausted their foreign-exchange reserves during the war, and the Marshall Plan aid represented almost their sole means of importing goods from abroad. At the start of the plan, these imports were mainly much-needed staples such as food and fuel, but later the purchases turned toward reconstruction needs as was originally intended. In the latter years, under pressure from the United States Congress and with the outbreak of the Korean War, an increasing amount of the aid was spent on rebuilding the militaries of Western Europe. Of the some US$13B allotted by mid-1951, $3.4B had been spent on imports of raw materials and semi-manufactured products; $3.2B on food, feed, and fertilizer; $1.9B on machines, vehicles and equipment; and $1.6B on fuel.

Also established were counterpart funds, which used Marshall Plan aid to establish funds in the local currency. According to ECA rules, recipients had to invest 60% of these funds in industry. This was prominent in Germany where these government-administered funds played a crucial role in lending money to private enterprises which would spend the money rebuilding. These funds played a central role in the reindustrialization of Germany. In 1949–50, for instance, 40% of the investment in the German coal industry was by these funds.

The companies were obligated to repay the loans to the government, and the money would then be lent out to another group of businesses. This process has continued to this day in the guise of the state-owned KfW bank, (Kreditanstalt für Wiederaufbau, meaning Reconstruction Credit Institute). The Special Fund, then supervised by the Federal Economics Ministry, was worth over DM 10B in 1971. In 1997 it was worth DM 23B. Through the revolving loan system, the Fund had by the end of 1995 made low-interest loans to German citizens amounting to around DM 140B. The other 40% of the counterpart funds were used to pay down the debt, stabilize the currency, or invest in non-industrial projects. France made the most extensive use of counterpart funds, using them to reduce the budget deficit. In France, and most other countries, the counterpart fund money was absorbed into general government revenues, and not recycled as in Germany.

The Netherlands received US aid for economic recovery in the Netherlands Indies. However, in January 1949, the American government suspended this aid in response to the Dutch efforts to restore colonial rule in Indonesia during the Indonesian National Revolution, and it implicitly threatened to suspend Marshall aid to the Netherlands if the Dutch government continued to oppose the independence of Indonesia.

At the time, the United States was a significant oil producing nation—one of the goals of the Marshall Plan was for Europe to use oil in place of coal, but the Europeans wanted to buy crude oil and use the Marshall Plan funds to build refineries instead. However, when independent American oil companies complained, the ECA denied funds for European refinery construction.

=== Technical Assistance Program ===
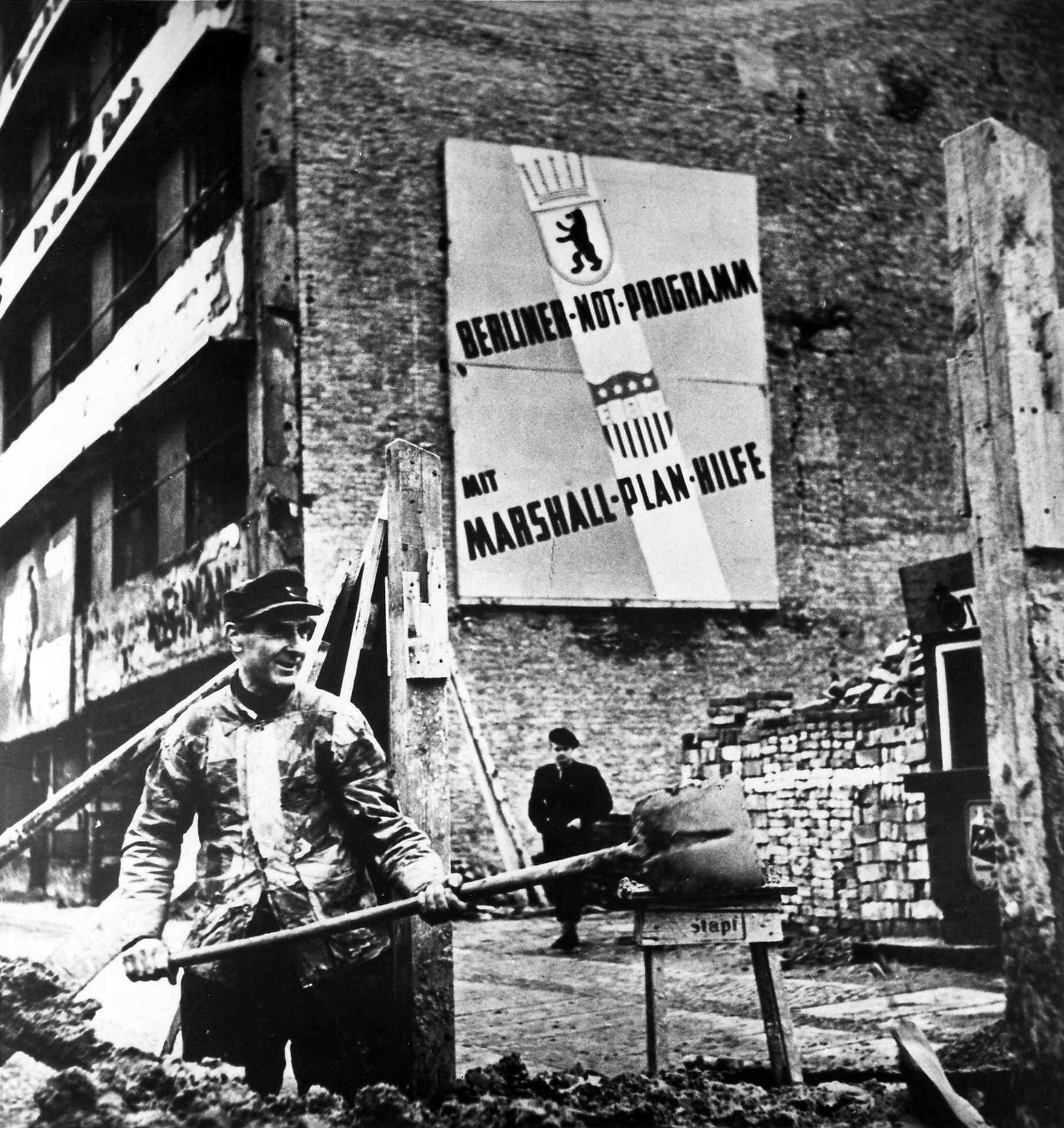
Construction in West Berlin with the help of the Marshall Plan after 1948. The plaque reads: "Emergency Program Berlin – with the help of the Marshall Plan"

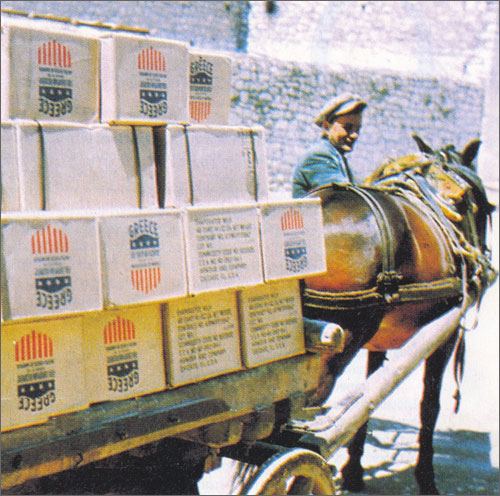
US aid to Greece under the Marshall Plan

A high priority was increasing industrial productivity in Europe, which proved one of the more successful aspects of the Marshall Plan. The United States Bureau of Labor Statistics (BLS) contributed heavily to the success of the Technical Assistance Program. The United States Congress passed a law on June 7, 1940, that allowed the BLS to "make continuing studies of labor productivity" and appropriated funds for the creation of a Productivity and Technological Development Division. The BLS could then use its expertise in the field of productive efficiency to implement a productivity drive in each Western European country receiving Marshall Plan aid. Counterpart funds were used to finance large-scale tours of American industry. France, for example, sent 500 missions with 4700 businessmen and experts to tour US factories, farms, stores, and offices. They were especially impressed with the prosperity of American workers, and how they could purchase an inexpensive new automobile for nine months work, compared to 30 months in France.

By implementing technological literature surveys and organized plant visits, US economists, statisticians, and engineers were able to educate European manufacturers in statistical measurement. The goal of the statistical and technical assistance from the US was to increase productive efficiency of European manufacturers in all industries.

To conduct this analysis, the BLS performed two types of productivity calculations. First, they used existing data to calculate how much a worker produces per hour of work—the average output rate. Second, they compared the existing output rates in a particular country to output rates in other nations. By performing these calculations across all industries, the BLS was able to identify the strengths and weaknesses of each country's manufacturing and industrial production. From that, the BLS could recommend technologies (especially statistical) that each individual nation could implement. Often, these technologies came from the United States; by the time the Technical Assistance Program began, the United States used statistical technologies "more than a generation ahead of what [the Europeans] were using".

The BLS used these statistical technologies to create Factory Performance Reports for Western European nations. The American government sent hundreds of technical advisers to Europe to observe workers in the field. This on-site analysis made the Factory Performance Reports especially helpful to the manufacturers. In addition, the Technical Assistance Program funded 24,000 European engineers, leaders, and industrialists to visit the US and tour its factories, mines, and manufacturing plants. This way, the European visitors would be able to return to their home countries and implement the technologies used in the United States. The analyses in the Factory Performance Reports and the "hands-on" experience had by the European productivity teams effectively identified productivity deficiencies in European industries; from there, it became clearer how to make European production more effective.

Before the Technical Assistance Program even went into effect, United States Secretary of Labor Maurice Tobin expressed his confidence in American productivity and technology to both American and European economic leaders. He urged that the United States play a large role in improving European productive efficiency by providing four recommendations for the program's administrators:

1. That BLS productivity personnel should serve on American-European councils for productivity;
2. that productivity targets (based on American productivity standards) can and should be implemented to increase productivity;
3. that there should be a general exchange and publication of information; and
4. that the "technical abstract" service should be the central source of information.

The effects of the Technical Assistance Program were not limited to improvements in productive efficiency. While the thousands of European leaders took their work/study trips to the United States, they were able to observe a number of aspects of American society as well. The Europeans could watch local, state, and federal governments work together with citizens in a pluralist society. They observed a democratic society with open universities and civic societies in addition to more advanced factories and manufacturing plants. The Technical Assistance Program allowed Europeans to bring home many types of American ideas.

Another important aspect of the Technical Assistance Program was its low cost. While US$19.4B was allocated for capital costs in the Marshall Plan, the Technical Assistance Program only required $300M. Only $100M of that was paid by the United States.

=== United Kingdom ===
The economy was precarious during the age of austerity, as wartime restrictions and rationing continued, and the wartime bombing damage was slowly being rebuilt at great cost. The Treasury depended heavily on US money, especially the 1946 loan of US$3.75B at a low 2% interest rate. Even more helpful was the gift of $2.694 billion in Marshall Plan funds in 1948-1951. Canada also provided gifts and $1.25B in loans. The Marshall money was a gift but carried requirements that Britain balance its budget, control tariffs, improve management, and maintain adequate currency reserves. The British Labour government under Prime Minister Clement Attlee was an enthusiastic participant.

The US goals for the Marshall plan were to help rebuild the postwar British economy, help modernize the economy, and minimize trade barriers. When the Soviet Union refused to participate or allow its satellites to participate, the Marshall plan became an element of the emerging Cold War.

There were political tensions between the two nations regarding Marshall plan requirements. London was dubious about Washington's emphasis on European economic integration as the solution to postwar recovery. Integration with Europe at this point would mean cutting close ties to the emerging Commonwealth. London tried to convince Washington that US economic aid, especially to the sterling currency area, was necessary to solve the dollar shortage. British economists argued that their position was validated by 1950 as European industrial production exceeded prewar levels. Washington demanded convertibility of sterling currency on 15 July 1947, which produced a severe financial crisis for Britain. Convertibility was suspended on 20 August 1947. However, by 1950, American rearmament and heavy spending on the Korean War and Cold War finally ended the dollar shortage. The balance of payment problems that troubled the postwar government was caused less by economic decline and more by political overreach, according to Jim Tomlinson.

According to economic historians N.F.R. Crafts and Nicholas Woodward, the Marshall Plan money had a powerful multiplier effect. In 1948-1949 free imports from the United States amounted to 2.4% of British GNP. However, they calculate that the multiplier effects increased the 1949 GNP by 10% to 20%.

=== West Germany and Austria ===
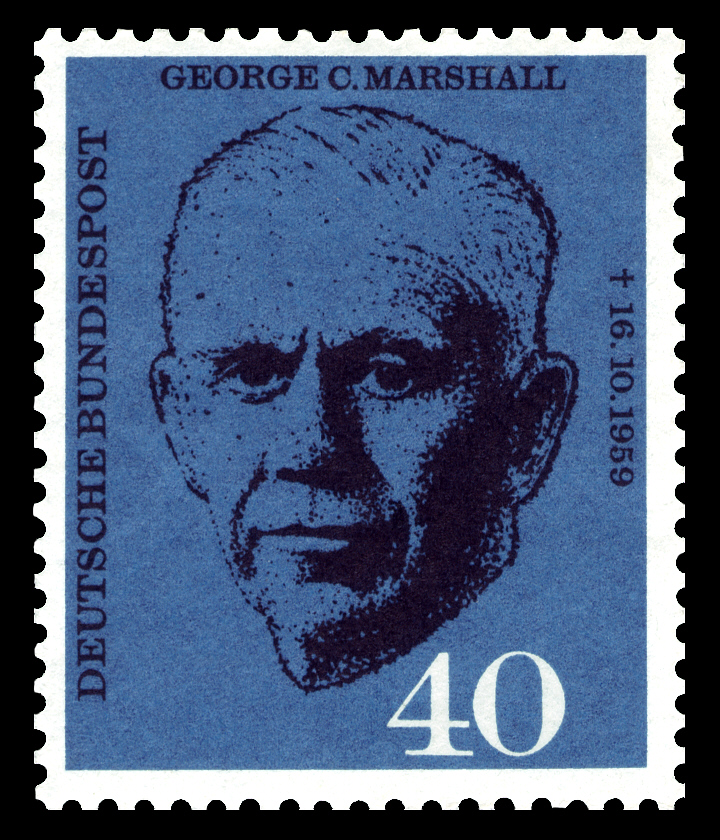
1960 West German stamp honoring George Marshall

The Marshall Plan was implemented in West Germany (1948–1950), as a way to modernize business procedures and utilize the best practices. As a major prerequisite for delivery of aid, the Currency Reform of 1948 was implemented on June 20. The Marshall Plan made it possible for West Germany to return quickly to its traditional pattern of industrial production with a strong export sector. Without the plan, agriculture would have played a larger role in the recovery period, which itself would have been longer. With respect to Austria, Günter Bischof has noted that "the Austrian economy, injected with an overabundance of European Recovery Program funds, produced "miracle" growth figures that matched and at times surpassed the German ones."

Marshall aid in general and the counterpart funds in particular had a significant impact in Cold-War propaganda and economic matters in Western Europe, which most likely contributed to the declining appeal of domestic communist parties.

== Expenditures ==
The Marshall Plan aid was divided among the participant states on a roughly per capita basis. A larger amount was given to the major industrial powers, as the prevailing opinion was that their resuscitation was essential for general European revival. Somewhat more aid per capita was also directed toward the Allied nations, with less for those that had been part of the Axis or remained neutral. The exception was Iceland, which had been neutral during the war, but received far more on a per capita basis than the second highest recipient.

The table below shows Marshall Plan aid by country and year (in millions of dollars) from The Marshall Plan Fifty Years Later. There is no clear consensus on exact amounts, as different scholars differ on exactly what elements of American aid during this period were part of the Marshall Plan.

| Country | 1948/49 ($ millions) | 1949/50 ($ millions) | 1950/51 ($ millions) | Cumulative (US$ millions) |
|---|---|---|---|---|
| Austria | 232 | 166 | 70 | 468 |
| Belgium and Luxembourg | 195 | 222 | 360 | 777 |
| Denmark | 103 | 87 | 195 | 385 |
| France | 1,085 | 691 | 520 | 2,296 |
| West Germany | 510 | 438 | 500 | 1,448 |
| Greece | 175 | 156 | 45 | 376 |
| Iceland | 6 | 22 | 15 | 43 |
| Ireland | 88 | 45 | 0 | 133 |
| Italy and Trieste | 594 | 405 | 205 | 1,204 |
| Netherlands | 471 | 302 | 355 | 1,128 |
| Norway | 82 | 90 | 200 | 372 |
| Portugal | 0 | 0 | 70 | 70 |
| Sweden | 39 | 48 | 260 | 347 |
| Turkey | 28 | 59 | 50 | 137 |
| United Kingdom | 1,316 | 921 | 1,060 | 3,297 |
| Totals | 4,924 | 3,652 | 4,155 | 12,731 |

== Loans and grants ==
The Marshall Plan, just as GARIOA, consisted of aid both in the form of grants and in the form of loans. Out of the total, US$1.2B were loan-aid.

Ireland which received US$146.2M through the Marshall Plan, received US$128.2M as loans, and the remaining US$18M as grants. By 1969 the Irish Marshall Plan debt, which was still being repaid, amounted to £31M, out of a total Irish foreign debt of £50M. The UK received US$385M of its Marshall Plan aid in the form of loans. Unconnected to the Marshall Plan the UK also received direct loans from the US amounting to US$4.6B. The proportion of Marshall Plan loans versus Marshall Plan grants was roughly 15% to 85% for both the UK and France.

Germany, which up until the 1953 debt agreement had to work on the assumption that all the Marshall Plan aid was to be repaid, spent its funds very carefully. Payment for Marshall Plan goods, "counterpart funds", were administered by the Reconstruction Credit Institute, which used the funds for loans inside Germany. In the 1953 debt agreement, the amount of Marshall Plan aid that Germany was to repay was reduced to less than US$1 billion. This made the proportion of loans versus grants to Germany similar to that of France and the UK. The final German loan repayment was made in 1971. Since Germany chose to repay the aid debt out of the German Federal budget, leaving the German ERP fund intact, the fund was able to continue its reconstruction work. By 1996 it had accumulated a value of DM23B.

Economic aid from 3 April 1948 to 30 June 1952 (in US$ millions at the time)
| Countries | Total (m$.) | Grants (m$.) | Loans (m$.) |
|---|---|---|---|
| Austria | 677.8 | 677.8 | / |
| Belgium-Luxembourg | 559.3 | 491.3 | 68.0 (Note: The total of the loan includes $65M for Belgium and $3M for Luxembourg: it is impossible to define the respective grants among the two countries.) |
| Denmark | 273.0 | 239.7 | 33.3 |
| France | 2,713.6 | 2,488.0 | 255.6 |
| Germany (FRG) | 1,390.6 | 1,173.7 | 216.9 (Note: This includes a first loan of $16.9 million, to which were added $200 million representing a proportionally divided portion of grants converted into loans according to an agreement signed on 27 February 1953.) |
| Greece | 706.7 | 706.7 | / |
| Iceland | 29.3 | 24.0 | 5.3 |
| Ireland | 147.5 | 19.3 | 128.2 |
| Italy (incl. Trieste) | 1,208.8 | 1,113.2 | 95.6 |
| Netherlands (*Indonesia) (Note: Aid of the Marshall Plan to the Dutch East Indies (Indonesia) extended to the Netherlands before the transfer of sovereignty on 30 December 1949. Total aids for the Dutch East Indies amounted to $101.4 million ($84.2 million in grants, $17.2 million in loans).) | 1,083.5 | 916.8 | 166.7 |
| Norway | 255.3 | 216.1 | 39.2 |
| Portugal | 51.2 | 15.1 | 36.1 |
| Sweden | 107.3 | 86.9 | 20.4 |
| Turkey | 225.1 | 140.1 | 85.0 |
| United Kingdom | 3,189.8 | 2,895.0 | 384.8 |
| Regional | 407.0 (Note: This includes the US contribution to the funds of the European Payments Union, $361.4M; general freight account $33.5M; European authorisations for technical assistance (multi-countries or regional) $12.1M.) | 407.0 | / |
| Total for all countries | 13,325.8 | 11,820.7 | 1,505.1 |

== Funding for CIA fronts ==
The Central Intelligence Agency received 5% of the Marshall Plan funds (about US$685M spread over six years), which it used to finance secret operations abroad. Through the Office of Policy Coordination money was directed toward support for labor unions, newspapers, student groups, artists and intellectuals, who were countering the anti-American counterparts subsidized by the communists. The largest sum went to the Congress for Cultural Freedom. There were no agents working among the Soviets or their satellite states. The founding conference of the Congress for Cultural Freedom was held in Berlin in June 1950. Among the leading intellectuals from the US and Western Europe were writers, philosophers, critics and historians: Raymond Aron, Alfred Ayer, Franz Borkenau, Irving Brown, James Burnham, Benedetto Croce, John Dewey, Sidney Hook, Karl Jaspers, Arthur Koestler, Melvin J. Lasky, Richard Löwenthal, Ernst Reuter, Bertrand Russell, Arthur M. Schlesinger Jr., Ignazio Silone, Hugh Trevor-Roper, and Tennessee Williams. There were conservatives among the participants, but non-communist (or former communist) leftists were more numerous.

== Effects and legacy ==
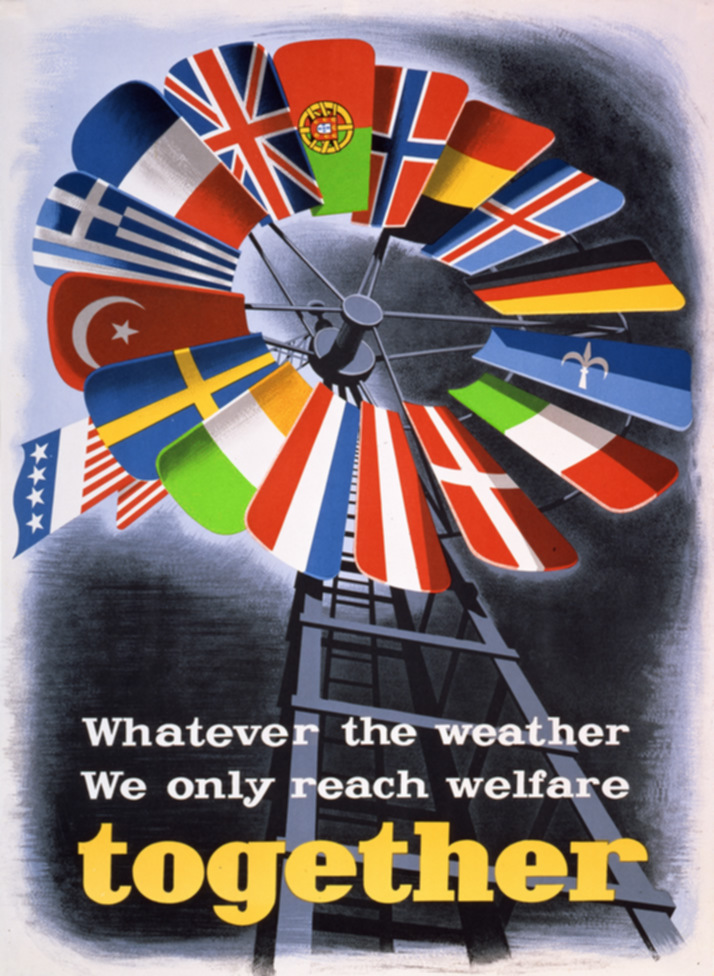
One of the numerous posters created to promote the Marshall Plan in Europe. Note the pivotal position of the American flag. The blue and white flag between those of Germany and Italy is a version of the Trieste flag with the UN blue rather than the traditional red.

The Marshall Plan was originally scheduled to end in 1953. Any effort to extend it was halted by the growing cost of the Korean War and rearmament. American Republicans hostile to the plan had also gained seats in the 1950 Congressional elections, and conservative opposition to the plan was revived. Thus the plan ended in 1951, though various other forms of American aid to Europe continued afterward.

The years 1948 to 1952 saw the fastest period of growth in European history. Industrial production increased by 35%. Agricultural production substantially surpassed pre-war levels. The poverty and starvation of the immediate postwar years disappeared, and Western Europe embarked upon an unprecedented two decades of growth that saw standards of living increase dramatically. Additionally, the long-term effect of economic integration raised European income levels substantially, by nearly 20% by the mid-1970s. There is some debate among historians over how much this should be credited to the Marshall Plan. Most reject the idea that it alone miraculously revived Europe, as evidence shows that a general recovery was already underway. Most believe that the Marshall Plan sped this recovery, but did not initiate it. Many argue that the structural adjustments that it forced were of great importance. Economic historians J. Bradford DeLong and Barry Eichengreen call it "history's most successful structural adjustment program". One effect of the plan was that it subtly "Americanized" European countries, especially Austria, through new exposure to American popular culture, including the growth in influence of Hollywood movies and rock n' roll.

The political effects of the Marshall Plan may have been just as important as the economic ones. Marshall Plan aid allowed the nations of Western Europe to relax austerity measures and rationing, reducing discontent and bringing political stability. The communist influence on Western Europe was greatly reduced, and throughout the region, communist parties faded in popularity in the years after the Marshall Plan. The trade relations fostered by the Marshall Plan helped forge the North Atlantic alliance that would persist throughout the Cold War in the form of NATO. At the same time, the nonparticipation of the states of the Eastern Bloc was one of the first clear signs that the continent was now divided.

The Marshall Plan also played an important role in European integration. Both the Americans and many of the European leaders felt that European integration was necessary to secure the peace and prosperity of Europe, and thus used Marshall Plan guidelines to foster integration. In some ways, this effort failed, as the OEEC never grew to be more than an agent of economic cooperation. Rather, it was the separate European Coal and Steel Community, which did not include Britain, that would eventually grow into the European Union. However, the OEEC served as both a testing and training ground for the structures that would later be used by the European Economic Community. The Marshall Plan, linked into the Bretton Woods system, also mandated free trade throughout the region.

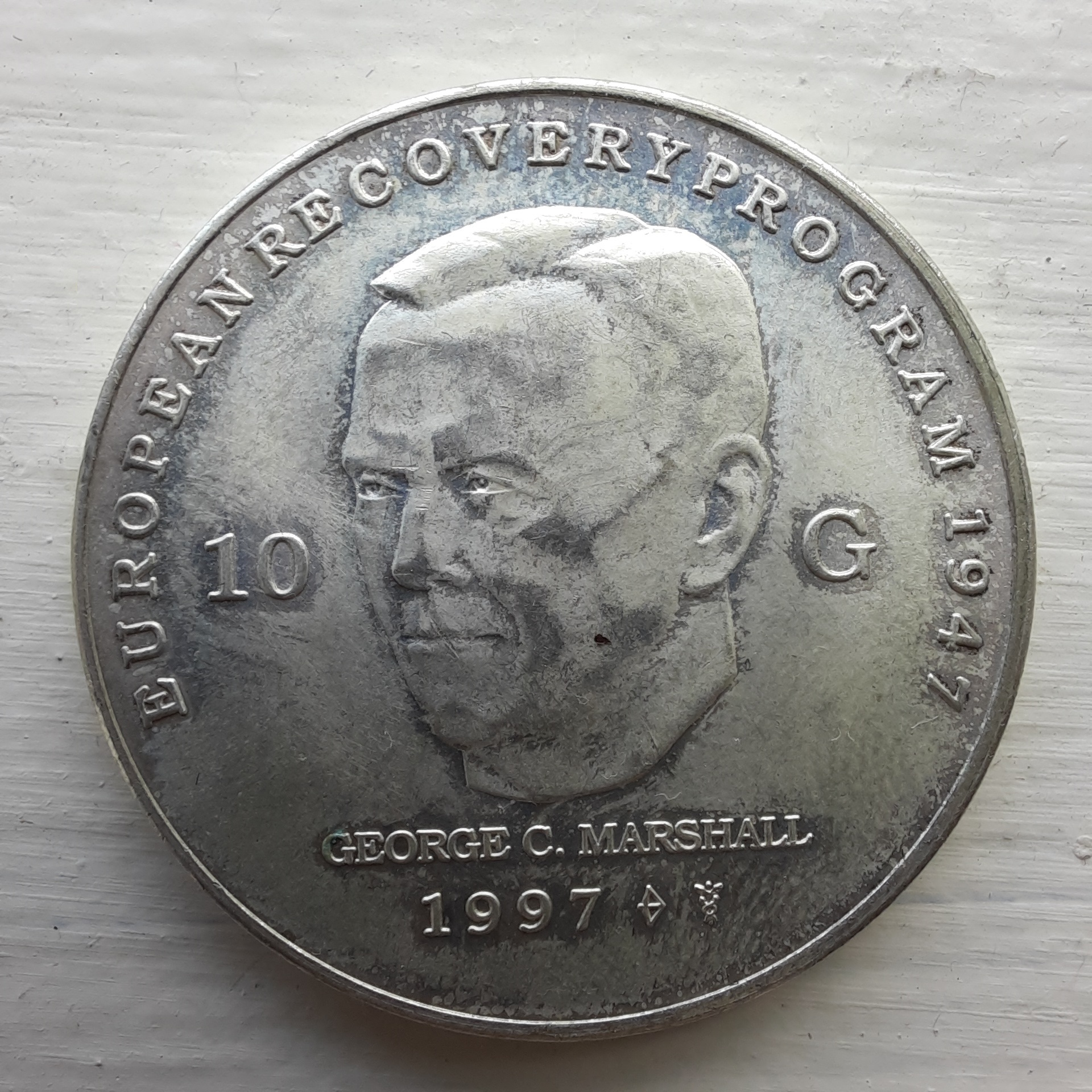
Dutch 10 guilder coin commemorating the 50th anniversary of the Marshall Plan, 1997

While some historians today feel some of the praise for the Marshall Plan is exaggerated, it is still viewed favorably and many thus feel that a similar project would help other areas of the world. The events of 1947 are thus part and parcel of the larger story of the Cold War. These events played a major role, but it would be a mistake to exaggerate their significance. The bloc system in Europe took years to develop, and the Marshall Plan was just one part of the story. After the fall of communism, several proposed a "Marshall Plan for Eastern Europe" that would help revive that region. Others have proposed a Marshall Plan for Africa to help that continent, and US Vice President Al Gore suggested a Global Marshall Plan. (Note: Marshall Plan style proposals for other parts of the world have been a perennial idea. For instance, Tony Blair and Gordon Brown have referred to their African aid goals as "a Marshall Plan". After the end of the Cold War many felt Eastern Bloc needed a rebuilding plan.) "Marshall Plan" has become a metaphor for any very large-scale government program that is designed to solve a specific social problem. It is usually used when calling for federal spending to correct a perceived failure of the private sector.

== Repayment ==
The Organisation for European Economic Co-operation (OEEC) took the leading role in allocating funds, and the OEEC arranged for the transfer of the goods. The US supplier was paid in dollars, which were credited against the appropriate European Recovery Program funds. The European recipient, however, was not given the goods as a gift but had to pay for them (usually on credit) in local currency. These payments were kept by the European government involved in a special counterpart fund. This counterpart money, in turn, could be used by the government for further investment projects. Five percent of the counterpart money was paid to the US to cover the administrative costs of the ERP. In addition to ERP grants, the Export–Import Bank (an agency of the US government) at the same time made long-term loans at low interest rates to finance major purchases in the US, all of which were repaid.

In the case of Germany, there also were DM16B of debts from the 1920s which had defaulted in the 1930s, but which Germany decided to repay to restore its reputation. This money was owed to government and private banks in the US, France, and Britain. Another DM16B represented postwar loans by the US. Under the London Debts Agreement of 1953, the repayable amount was reduced by 50% to about DM15B and stretched out over 30 years, and compared to the fast-growing German economy were of minor impact.

== Areas excluded ==
Large parts of the world devastated by World War II did not benefit from the Marshall Plan. The only major Western European nation excluded was Spain, whose regime under Francisco Franco was highly unpopular in Washington. With the escalation of the Cold War, the United States reconsidered its position and in 1951 embraced Spain as an ally since it was encouraged by Franco's aggressive anti-communist policies. Over the next decade, a considerable amount of American aid would go to Spain but less than its neighbors had received under the Marshall Plan.

The Soviet Union had been as badly affected as any other part of the world by the war. The Soviets imposed large reparations payments on the Axis allies that were in its sphere of influence. Austria, Finland, Hungary, Romania, and especially East Germany were forced to pay vast sums and ship large amounts of supplies to the Soviet Union. Those reparation payments meant the Soviet Union itself received about the same as 16 European countries received in total from Marshall Plan aid.

In accordance with the agreements with the Soviet Union, shipment of dismantled German industrial installations from the west began on March 31, 1946. Under the terms of the agreement, the Soviet Union would in return ship raw materials such as food and timber to the western zones. In view of the Soviet failure to do so, the western zones halted the shipments east, ostensibly on a temporary basis, although they were never resumed. It was later shown that the main reason for halting shipments east was not the behavior of the Soviet Union but rather the recalcitrant behavior of France. Examples of material received by the Soviets were equipment from the Kugel-Fischer ballbearing plant at Schweinfurt, the Daimler-Benz underground aircraft-engine plant at Obrigheim, the Deschimag shipyards at Bremen-Weser, and the Gendorf powerplant.

The Soviets established COMECON as a riposte to the Marshall Plan to deliver aid for Eastern Bloc countries, but that was complicated by the Soviet efforts to manage their own recovery from the war. The members of Comecon looked to the Soviet Union for oil and in turn provided machinery, equipment, agricultural goods, industrial goods, and consumer goods to the Soviet Union. Economic recovery in the East was much slower than in the West, resulting in the formation of the shortage economies and a gap in wealth between East and West. Finland, which the Soviets forbade from joining the Marshall Plan and was required to give large reparations to the Soviets, saw its economy recover to pre-war levels in 1947. France, which received billions of dollars through the Marshall Plan, similarly saw its average income per person return to almost pre-war level by 1949. By mid-1948 industrial production in Poland, Hungary, Bulgaria, and Czechoslovakia had recovered to a level somewhat above pre-war level.

=== Aid to Asia ===
From the end of the war to the end of 1953, the US provided grants and credits amounting to US$5.9B to Asian countries, especially the Republic of China (Taiwan) ($1.051B), India ($255M), Indonesia ($215M), Japan ($2.444B), South Korea ($894M), Pakistan ($98M) and the Philippines ($803M). In addition, another $282M went to Israel and $196M to the rest of the Middle East. (Note: All data from the official document: U.S. Bureau of the Census, Statistical Abstract of the United States: 1954 (1955) table 1075 pp. 899–902 online edition file 1954-08.pdf) While much of this aid was given during Marshall's tenure as Secretary of State, it was separate from the Marshall Plan itself.

=== Canada ===
Canada's infrastructure was damaged little by the war, as most of the war was fought in Europe, Asia, and the Pacific. In 1948, the US allowed ERP aid to be used to buy goods from Canada. In its first two years of operation, ERP funded over one billion dollars' worth of trade with Canada.

=== World total ===
The total of American grants and loans to the world from 1945 to 1953 came to $44.3B.

== Opinion ==
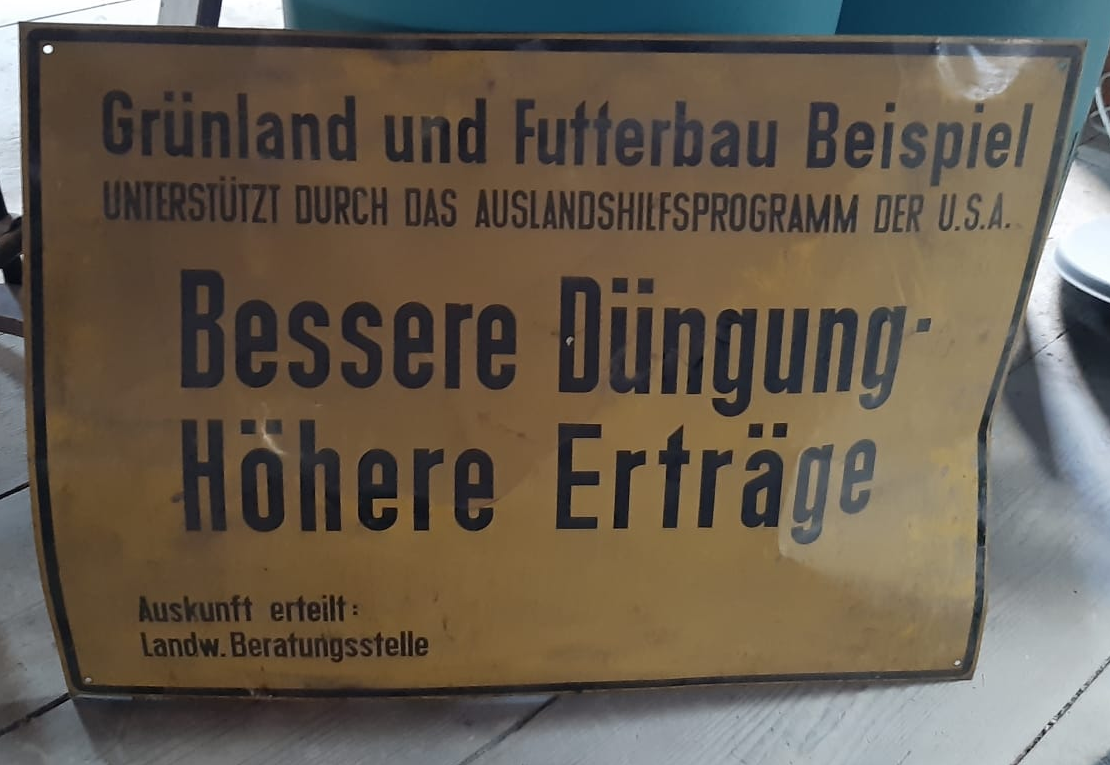
German sign indicating "agriculture counseling supported by the overseas aid program of the U.S.A."

Bradford DeLong and Barry Eichengreen conclude it was "History's Most Successful Structural Adjustment Program". They state:

It was not large enough to have significantly accelerated recovery by financing investment, aiding the reconstruction of damaged infrastructure, or easing commodity bottlenecks. We argue, however, that the Marshall Plan did play a major role in setting the stage for post-World War II Western Europe's rapid growth. The conditions attached to Marshall Plan aid pushed European political economy in a direction that left its post World War II "mixed economies" with more "market" and less "controls" in the mix.

=== Domestic campaign for support ===
Prior to passing and enacting the Marshall Plan, President Truman and George Marshall started a domestic overhaul of public opinion from coast to coast. The purpose of this campaign was to sway public opinion in their direction and to inform the common person of what the Marshall Plan was and what the plan would ultimately do. They spent months attempting to convince Americans that their cause was just and that they should embrace the higher taxes that would come in the foreseeable future. The Great Depression left Americans acutely aware of the psychological and political effects of poverty. Though the Marshall Plan is seen as an act of compassion or sympathy for countries struggling after WWII, it is likely fear of slipping into another depression at home caused the United States to invest in diplomacy and pivot away from another economic calamity.

A copious amount of propaganda ended up being highly effective in swaying public opinion toward supporting the Marshall Plan. During the nationwide campaign for support, "more than a million pieces of pro-Marshall Plan publications-booklets, leaflets, reprints, and fact sheets", were disseminated. Truman's and Marshall's efforts proved to be effective. A Gallup Poll taken between the months of July and December 1947 shows the percentage of Americans unaware of the Marshall Plan fell from 51% to 36% nationwide. By the time the Marshall Plan was ready to be implemented, there was a general consensus throughout the American public that this was the right policy for both America and the countries who would be receiving aid.

=== Change in US ideology ===
During the period leading up to World War II, the US was highly isolationist, and many called The Marshall Plan a "milestone" for US ideology. By looking at polling data over time from pre-World War II to post-World War II, one would find that there was a change in public opinion in regards to ideology. Americans swapped their isolationist ideals for a much more global internationalist ideology after World War II.

=== Polling data ===
In a National Opinion Research Center (NORC) poll taken in April 1945, a cross-section of Americans were asked, "If our government keeps on sending lendlease materials, which we may not get paid for, to friendly countries for about three years after the war, do you think this will mean more jobs or fewer jobs for most Americans, or won't it make any difference?" 57% said more jobs, 18% no-change in jobs; 10% said fewer.

Before proposing anything to Congress in 1947, the Truman administration made an elaborate effort to organize public opinion in favor of the Marshall Plan spending, reaching out to numerous national organizations representing business, labor, farmers, women, and other interest groups. Political scientist Ralph Levering points out that:

Mounting large public relations campaigns and supporting private groups such as the Citizens Committee for the Marshall Plan, the administration carefully built public and bipartisan Congressional support before bringing these measures to a vote.

Public opinion polls in 1947 consistently showed strong support for the Marshall plan among Americans. Furthermore, Gallup polls in England, France, and Italy showed favorable majorities over 60%.

== Criticism ==
=== Laissez-faire criticism ===
Laissez-faire criticism of the Marshall Plan came from a number of economists. Wilhelm Röpke, who influenced German Minister for Economy Ludwig Erhard in his economic recovery program, believed recovery would be found in eliminating central planning and restoring a market economy in Europe, especially in those countries which had adopted more fascist and corporatist economic policies. Röpke criticized the Marshall Plan for forestalling the transition to the free market by subsidizing the current, failing systems. Erhard put Röpke's theory into practice and would later credit Röpke's influence for West Germany's preeminent success.

Henry Hazlitt criticized the Marshall Plan in his 1947 book Will Dollars Save the World?, arguing that economic recovery comes through savings, capital accumulation, and private enterprise, and not through large cash subsidies. Austrian School economist Ludwig von Mises criticized the Marshall Plan in 1951, believing that "the American subsidies make it possible for [Europe's] governments to conceal partially the disastrous effects of the various socialist measures they have adopted". This neoliberal criticism overlooks the fact that the 1953 London Agreement was created to facilitate that development, effectively subsidizing Germany's development by forgiving half of its foreign debt.

=== Modern criticism ===
The Marshall Plan's role in the rapid recovery of Western Europe has been debated. Most reject the idea that it alone miraculously revived Europe since the evidence shows that a general recovery was already underway. The Marshall Plan grants were provided at a rate that was not much higher in terms of flow than the previous UNRRA aid and represented less than 3% of the combined national income of the recipient countries between 1948 and 1951, which would mean an increase in GDP growth of only 0.3%. In addition, there is no correlation between the amount of aid received and the speed of recovery: both France and the United Kingdom received more aid, but West Germany recovered significantly faster.

Criticism of the Marshall Plan became prominent among historians of the revisionist school, such as Walter LaFeber, during the 1960s and 1970s. They argued that the plan was American economic imperialism and that it was an attempt to gain control over Western Europe just as the Soviets controlled Eastern Europe economically through the Comecon. In a review of West Germany's economy from 1945 to 1951, German analyst Werner Abelshauser concluded that "foreign aid was not crucial in starting the recovery or in keeping it going". The economic recoveries of France, Italy, and Belgium, Cowen argues, began a few months before the flow of US money. Belgium, the country that relied earliest and most heavily on free-market economic policies after its liberation in 1944, experienced swift recovery and avoided the severe housing and food shortages seen in the rest of continental Europe.

Former US Chairman of the Federal Reserve Bank Alan Greenspan gives most credit to German Chancellor Ludwig Erhard for Europe's economic recovery. Greenspan writes in his memoir The Age of Turbulence that Erhard's economic policies were the most important aspect of postwar Western European recovery, even outweighing the contributions of the Marshall Plan. He states that it was Erhard's reductions in economic regulations that permitted Germany's miraculous recovery, and that these policies also contributed to the recoveries of many other European countries. Its recovery is attributed to traditional economic stimuli, such as increases in investment, fueled by a high savings rate and low taxes. Japan saw a large infusion of US investment during the Korean War.

The Marshall Plan has been recently reinterpreted as a public policy approach to complex and multi-causal problems in search of building integrated solutions with multilevel governance.

=== In popular culture ===
The 1953 Spanish comedy film Welcome Mr. Marshall! depicts Castilian villagers preparing for a visit of the American authorities and hoping they will fulfill their desires. When the American motorcade arrives, it speeds through the village and the villagers themselves have to pay for the preparations. Underneath the surface, the film is an anti-Francoist satire despite receiving approval because the censorship board understood it to be an anti-American satire.

== See also ==
- Dulles' Plan
- Foreign policy of the United States
- Timeline of United States diplomatic history
- Milton Katz
- GITP (example of a company that was built with Marshall aid)
- Basket of Bread, a 1945 painting by Salvador Dalí used to illustrate the plan.

== Bibliography ==
- Agnew, John; Entrikin, Nicholas (2004). The Marshall Plan Today: Model and Metaphor. Oxfordshire, England: Routledge. ISBN 0714655147.
- Badinger, Harald (2005). "Growth effects of economic integration: evidence from the EU member states". Review of World Economics. 141: 50–78. doi:10.1007/s10290-005-0015-y. S2CID 153722570.
- Bailey, Thomas A. (1977). The Marshall Plan Summer: An Eyewitness Report on Europe and the Russians in 1947. Stanford: Hoover Institution Press. ISBN 0817942017. OCLC 932208923.
- Balabkins, Nicholas (1964). Germany Under Direct Controls: Economic Aspects of Industrial Disarmament 1945–1948. Rutgers University Press.
- Bartlett, Thomas (2018). The Cambridge History of Ireland: Volume 4, 1880 to the Present. Cambridge UP. ISBN 978-1108605823.
- Behrman, Greg (2007). The Most Noble Adventure: The Marshall Plan and the Time When America Helped Save Europe. New York: Free Press. ISBN 978-0743282635. OCLC 934013761.
- Beschloss, Michael R (2003). The Conquerors: Roosevelt, Truman and the Destruction of Hitler's Germany, 1941–1945. Simon & Schuster. ISBN 978-0-7432-6085-5.
- Biesinger, Josepha A. (2006). Germany: A Reference Guide from the Renaissance to the Present. New York: Facts on File.
- "Biography of Wilhelm Röpke (1899–1966): Humane Economist". Mises.org. August 2007.
- Bischof, Gunter; Pelinka, Anton; Stiefel, Dieter (2000). Contemporary Austrian Studies: The Marshall Plan in Austria. New Brunswick, NJ: Transaction.
- Bischof (2020). "The Post–World War II Allied Occupation of Austria: What Can We Learn about It for Iraq in Successful Nation Building?". Journal of Austrian-American History. 4: 38–72. doi:10.5325/jaustamerhist.4.0038. JSTOR 10.5325/jaustamerhist.4.0038. S2CID 226469224.
- Bothwell, Robert (1998). The Big Chill: Canada and the Cold War. Toronto: Irwin Publishing Ltd.
- Brookings Institution. "Brookings's Role in the Marshall Plan". brookings.edu. Archived from the original on August 6, 2013.
- Brown, Lewis H. (1947). "A Report on Germany". New York, Farrar, Straus.
- "Brown calls for African Marshall Plan". The Guardian. June 3, 2005. Archived from the original on September 17, 2021.
- Buchanon, Tom (2006). Europe's Troubled Peace 1945–2000. Wiley. ISBN 0631221638.
- Campbell, John C. (1948). The United States in World affairs: 1947–1948. New York: Harper (for the Council on Foreign Relations.
- Cantril, Albert H.; Strunk, Mildred, eds. (1951). Public Opinion, 1935–1946. Princeton: Princeton University Press. OCLC 558666851.
- Carew, Anthony (1987). Labour Under the Marshall Plan: The Politics of Productivity and the Marketing of Management Science. Manchester University Press. ISBN 978-0-7190-2553-2.
- "Carnations". Time. February 9, 1948. Archived from the original on October 15, 2008.
- Chomsky, Noam (2002). The Umbrella of U.s. Power: The Universal Declaration of Human Rights and the Contradictions of U.s. Policy. New York: Seven Stories Press. ISBN 1583225471. OCLC 472121486.
- Cini, Michelle (2001). "From the Marshall Plan to the EEC". In Schain, Martin (ed.). The Marshall Plan: Fifty Years After. New York: Palgrave.
- Clayton, William L. (1963). "GATT, the Marshall Plan, and OECD". Political Science Quarterly. 78 (4): 493–503. doi:10.2307/2146352. JSTOR 2146352.
- "Conferences: Pas de Pagaille!". Time. July 28, 1947. Archived from the original on October 14, 2007.
- Crafts, Nicholas (2011). "The Marshall Plan: A Reality Check". University of Warwick CAGE Working Paper. 49: 6. CiteSeerX 10.1.1.570.8467.
- Crafts, N F. R; Toniolo, Gianni (1996). Economic Growth in Europe Since 1945. Cambridge: Cambridge University Press. ISBN 0521496276. OCLC 34884116.
- Cromwell, William C. (1982). "The Marshall Plan, Britain and the Cold War". Review of International Studies. 8 (4): 233–49. doi:10.1017/S0260210500115645. JSTOR 20096957. S2CID 146282742.
- De Long, J.; Eichengreen, Barry (1993). "The Marshall Plan". Postwar Economic Reconstruction and Lessons for the East Today. MIT Press. p. 202. ISBN 978-0262041362.
- DeLong, J. Bradford; Eichengreen, Barry (1993). "The Marshall Plan: History's Most Successful Structural Adjustment Program". In Dornbusch, Rudiger; Nolling, Wilhelm; Layard, Richard (eds.). Postwar Economic Reconstruction and Lessons for the East Today. MIT Press. pp. 189–230. ISBN 978-0-262-04136-2 – via Google Books.
- Eichengreen, Barry (2008). The European Economy Since 1945: Coordinated Capitalism and Beyond. Princeton University Press. ISBN 978-1400829545.
- Erhard, Ludwig. "Veröffentlichung von Wilhelm Röpke". In Memoriam Wilhelm Röpke. Universität Marburg, Rechts-und-Staatswissenschaftlice Fakultät [Law and Political Science Faculty].
- Fifield, Adam (2015). A Mighty Purpose: How Jim Grant Sold the World on Saving Its Children. Other Press, LLC. ISBN 978-1-59051-604-1.
- Forsberg, Aaron (2000). America and the Japanese miracle: the Cold War context of Japan's postwar economic revival, 1950–1960. UNC Press. ISBN 978-0-8078-2528-0.
- Fossat, Sissel Bjerrum (2018). "American Lessons in Mass Production and Mass Consumption: Danish Study Visits to the United States under the Marshall Plan's Technical Assistance Programme". Contemporary European History. 27 (4): 582–600. doi:10.1017/S0960777318000450. S2CID 159794820.
- Frankenfeld, Peter (2012). "A Marshall Plan for Greece? The European Union and the Financial Crisis in Greece. A Theoretical and Political Analysis in the Global World Against a Background of Regional Integration: Table 1. European Recovery Programme – Marshall Plan ($ million)". Prace i Materiały Instytutu Handlu Zagranicznego Uniwersytetu Gdańskiego (31/1): 69. ISSN 2300-6153.
- Gaddis, John Lewis (1997). We Now Know: Rethinking Cold War History. New York: Oxford University Press. ISBN 0198780702.
- Gallup, George H. (1972). The Gallup poll: public opinion 1935–1971. Vol. 1. New York: Random House. OCLC 504927769.
- "German Missions in the United States – Home". Germany.info. Archived from the original on July 9, 2006.
- "The U.S. State Department Analyzes the Soviet Note on Berlin". Germanhistorydocs.ghi-dc.org. January 7, 1959.
- Gimbel, John (1975). "The American Reparations Stop in Germany: An Essay On the Political Uses of History". The Historian. 37 (2): 276–96. doi:10.1111/j.1540-6563.1975.tb00026.x.
- Grogin, Robert C. (2001). Natural Enemies: The United States and the Soviet Union in the Cold War, 1917–1991. Lexington Books. ISBN 978-0739101605.
- Grünbacher, Armin (2012). "Cold-War Economics: The Use of Marshall Plan Counterpart Funds in Germany, 1948–1960" (PDF). Central European History. 45 (4): 697–716. doi:10.1017/S0008938912000659. S2CID 154541961.
- Guinnane, Timothy (2005). "Financial Vergangenheitsbewaeltigung: The 1953 London debt agreement". Yale University Economic Growth Center Discussion Paper. 880. SSRN 493802.
- Hanhimäki, Jussi M.; Westad, Odd Arne, eds. (2004). The Cold War: A History in Documents and Eyewitness Accounts. Oxford University Press. ISBN 978-0199272808.
- Hardach, Gerd (1987). "The Marshall Plan in Germany, 1948–1952". Journal of European Economic History. 16 (3): 433–85.
- Hardach, Gerd (2004). "The Marshall Plan". In Junker, Detlef (ed.). The United States and Germany in the Era of the Cold War, 1945–1990: A Handbook. Vol. 1. Cambridge, England: Cambridge University Press. ISBN 978-0521791120.
- Harries, Heinrich; Underwood, Peter (1998). Financing the Future: KfW – the German Bank with a Public Mission: 1948–1998. F. Knapp, 1998.
- Hitchens, Harold L. (1968). "Influences on the Congressional Decision to Pass the Marshall Plan". The Western Political Quarterly. 21 (1): 51–68. doi:10.2307/446512. JSTOR 446512.
- Hogan, Michael J. (1987). The Marshall Plan: America, Britain, and the Reconstruction of Western Europe, 1947–1952. Cambridge: Cambridge University Press. ISBN 0521378400. OCLC 416668932.
- Jeleński, Konstanty A. (1970). History and Hope: Tradition, Ideology, and Change in Modern Society. Freeport: Books for Libraries Press. OCLC 833529887.
- Johnson, Gordon (2002). "Lessons for Today from the Marshall Plan". CIPE.ORG Feature Service: Technical Paper Series: 2.
- Jonsson, Guðmundur; Snævarr, Sigurður (2008). "Iceland's Response to European Economic Integration". Pathbreakers: Small European Countries Responding to Globalisation and Deglobalisation. Peter Lang. p. 385.
- Judt, Tony (2001). Schain, Martin (ed.). The Marshall Plan: Fifty Years After. New York: Palgrave. OCLC 45284585.
- Kaplan, Jacob J. (March 22, 1999). "An overview of a career with foreign assistance" (PDF). Foreign Affairs Oral History Project, Foreign Assistance Series (Interview). Interviewed by W. Haven North. Arlington, VA: Association for Diplomatic Studies and Training.
- Klemann, Hein A. M. (1997). "De Nederlandse economie en de Tweede Wereldoorlog" [The Dutch economy and World-War Two)]. Tijdschrift voor Geschiedenis [Magazine for History] (in Dutch). 110: 3–40.
- Knapp, Manfred; Stolper, Wolfgang F.; Hudson, Michael (1981). "Reconstruction and West-Integration: The Impact of the Marshall Plan on Germany". Zeitschrift für die Gesamte Staatswissenschaft / Journal of Institutional and Theoretical Economics. 137 (3): 415–33. JSTOR 40750368.
- Kuisel, Richard F. (1993). Seducing the French: The Dilemma of Americanization. Berkeley: University of California Press. ISBN 0520079620. OCLC 26363961.
- Kunz, Diane B. (1997). "The Marshall Plan reconsidered: a complex of motives". Foreign Affairs. 76 (43): 162–70. doi:10.2307/20048105. JSTOR 20048105.
- Lampe, John R.; et al. (1990). Yugoslav-American Economic Relations Since World War II. Duke University Press. ISBN 978-0822310617.
- Lassance, Antonio (June 2021). "O Plano Marshall: uma abordagem atual à formulação, ao desenho e à coordenação de políticas públicas e programas governamentais" (PDF). Working Paper 2661: 61 – via Brazilian Institute of Applied Economic Research.
- Levering, Ralph B. (1978). The Public and American Foreign Policy, 1918–1978. New York: W. Morrow. OCLC 760514878.
- Lukacs, John (May 25, 1997). "A Look At ... The Legacy of the Marshall Plan". The Washington Post.
- Lydon, James F. (1998). The Making of Ireland: From Ancient Times to the Present. London: Routledge. ISBN 978-0415013482.
- Machado, Barry (2007). In Search of a Usable Past: The Marshall Plan and Postwar Reconstruction Today. Lexington, VA: George C Marshall Foundation. ISBN 978-0935524062.
- Maier, Charles S. (1990). "American Visions and British Interests: Hogan's Marshall Plan". Reviews in American History. 18 (1): 102–11. doi:10.2307/2702734. JSTOR 2702734.
- Major, Patrick (1996). "From Punishment to Partnership: New Studies on the Americans and the Reconstruction of Postwar Germany, 1945–1955". German History. 14 (1): 67–83.
- "Marshall Plan". Encyclopedia Britannica. January 27, 2020. Archived from the original on August 17, 2021.
- "A Marshall Plan for Iraq?". Cato.org. May 9, 2003. Archived from the original on January 22, 2009.
- Matusow, Allen J. (1967). Farm Policies and Politics in the Truman Years. Cambridge, Mass: Harvard University Press. OCLC 232021.
- McCauley, Martin (2016). Origins of the Cold War 1941–1949. Routledge. ISBN 978-1317362470. OCLC 930083204.
- Gordon, Lincoln (July 17, 1975). "Oral History Interview with Lincoln Gordon" (Interview). Interviewed by Richard D. McKinzie. Truman Library.
- McMahon, Robert J. (2003). The Cold War. Very Short Introductions. Oxford University Press. ISBN 0192801783.
- Mee, Charles L. (1984). The Marshall Plan: The Launching of Pax Americana. New York: Simon & Schuster. ISBN 978-0-671-42149-6.
- Miall, Leonard (September 19, 1977). "BBC Correspondent Leonard Miall and the Marshall Plan Speech: An Interview" (Interview). Interviewed by Barbara Vandegrift. The Marshall Foundation. Archived from the original on August 3, 2007.
- Mills, Nicolaus (2008). Winning the Peace: the Marshall Plan and America's Coming of Age as a Superpower. Wiley. ISBN 978-0-470-09755-7.
- Milward, Alan S. (1984). The Reconstruction of Western Europe 1945–51. Berkeley: University of California Press. ISBN 978-0520060357.
- Newton, C. C. S. (1984). "The Sterling Crisis of 1947 and the British Response to the Marshall Plan". Economic History Review. 37 (3): 391–408. doi:10.2307/2597288. JSTOR 2597288.
- Pelletiere, Stephen C. (2001). "3. The Fall of Mosadeq and the Triumph of the Oil Cartel in the United States". Iraq and the International Oil System: Why America Went to War in the Gulf. Greenwood Publishing Group. ISBN 978-0-275-94562-6.
- Pelling, Henry (1988). Britain and the Marshall Plan. New York: St. Martin's Press. ISBN 978-0312024277. OCLC 18052382.
- Price, Harry B. (1955). The Marshall Plan and Its Meaning. Ithaca, NY: Cornell University press. OCLC 1260514771.
- Raff, Deither (1988). A History of Germany from the Medieval Empire to the Present. New York: Berg. ISBN 0854962352.
- Roberts, Brad, ed. (1990). The New Democracies: Global Change and U.S. Policy. MIT Press. ISBN 978-0262680622.
- Roberts, Geoffrey (December 2000). "Historians and the Cold War". History Today.
- Saunders, Frances Stonor (1999). The Cultural Cold War: The CIA and the World of Arts and Letters. New York: New Press. ISBN 156584596X.
- Schaff, Marta (2009). Marshall Plan [Internet resource]. ISBN 978-1429804899. OCLC 746939415.
- Schain, Martin (2001). The Marshall Plan: Fifty Years After. New York: Palgrave. ISBN 978-0333929834. OCLC 45284585.
- Seppinen, Ilkka (2003). Harris, R.A. (ed.). Finland and the Space Era (PDF). Noordwijk: The Netherlands: The European Space Agency, ESA Publications Division. ISBN 92-9092-542-6. OCLC 52425760.
- Shaxson, Nicholas (2012). Treasure Islands: Tax Havens and the Men Who Stole the World. London: Vintage Press. Vintage. ISBN 978-0099541721. OCLC 755071509.
- Smuckler, Ralph H. (1953). "The Region of Isolationism". The American Political Science Review. 47 (2): 386–401. doi:10.2307/1952029. JSTOR 1952029. S2CID 144875635.
- Sobell (June 2, 1987). "A Look back at the Marshall Plan". Blinken Open Society Archives.
- Sorel, Eliot; Padoan, Pier C. (2008). The Marshall Plan: Lessons Learned for the 21st Century. Paris: OECD. ISBN 978-9264044241. OCLC 256729579.
- Statistical Abstract of the United States: 1949. Washington D. C.: United States Census Bureau. 1949.
- Tomlinson, Jim (2009). "Balanced accounts? Constructing the balance of payments problem in post-war Britain". English Historical Review. 124 (509): 863–84. doi:10.1093/ehr/cep185.
- Truman, Harry S. (1948). March 17, 1948 address to a Joint Session (Speech). trumanlibrary.gov. Archived from the original on September 20, 2021.
- "UK settles WWII debts to allies". December 29, 2006.
- UNRRA (1947). "10. Transfer of UNRRA Functions". Report of the Director General to the Council, Issues 12–14. United Nations Relief and Rehabilitation Administration.
- "US Inflation Calculator". USInflationCalculator.com.
- Van der Eng, Pierre (1988). "Marshall aid as a catalyst in the decolonisation of Indonesia 1947–1949". Journal of Southeast Asian Studies. 19: 335–52.
- Van der Wee, Herman (1984). Prosperity and Upheaval: The World Economy, 1945–1980. Berkeley: University of California Press. ISBN 978-0-520-05709-8.
- van Zanden, Luiten (1998). The Economic History of the Netherlands 1914–1995. Routledge. ISBN 04-1515-003-5.
- Volkogonov, Dmitri (1996). Stalin: Triumph and Tragedy. Forum. ISBN 0761507183.
- Von Mises, Ludwig (2006). "Profit and loss". Ludwig von Mises Institute.
- Vyshinsky, Andrei (September 1947). Speech to U.N. General Assembly (Speech). Philadelphia: Temple University. Archived from the original on July 14, 2010.
- "Potsdam Reparations Begin" (PDF). wisc.edu. 1946.
- Wala, Michael (1995). The Council on Foreign Relations and American Foreign Policy in the Early Cold War. Providence, RI: Berghahn Books. ISBN 157181003X. OCLC 503864539.
- Warriner, Doreen (1949). "Economic Changes in Eastern Bloc. Since the War". International Affairs. 25 (2). Royal Institute of International Affairs: 157–67. doi:10.2307/3017377. JSTOR 3017377.
- Wasser, Solidelle F; Dolfman, Michael L. (June 2005). "BLS and the Marshall Plan: The Forgotten Story" (PDF). Monthly Labor Review. Archived from the original on August 12, 2021.
- Weiner, Tim (2007). Legacy of Ashes: History of the CIA. New York: Doubleday. ISBN 978-0385514453.
- Wettig, Gerhard (2008). Stalin and the Cold War in Europe. Rowman & Littlefield. ISBN 978-0-7425-5542-6.
- "Wiederaufbau Deutschlands mit finanzieller Hilfe der Alliierten" [Reconstruction of Germany with Financial Help from the Allies]. KFW (in German). 2012.
- Zmirak, John (2001). Wilhelm Röpke: Swiss Localist, Global Economist. Wilmington, Del: ISI Books. ISBN 1882926560. OCLC 48568155.
- Zwass, Adam (1989). The Council for Mutual Economic Assistance: the thorny path from political to economic integration. M.E. Sharpe. ISBN 978-0-87332-496-0.
