= Basket of Bread =

1945 painting by Salvador Dalí

- Artist: Salvador Dalí
- Year: 1945
- Medium: Oil on panel
- Dimensions: 33 cm × 38 cm (13 in × 15 in)
- Location: Dalí Theatre and Museum; Figueres

Basket of Bread or Basket of Bread-Rather Death Than Shame is an oil painting by Spanish Surrealist artist Salvador Dalí, from 1945. The painting depicts a heel of a loaf bread in a basket, sitting near the edge of a table.

== Progression and comparison to Dalí's other versions of the subject ==
Dalí used bread in many of his paintings, and was quoted as saying:

"Bread has always been one of the oldest subjects of fetishism and obsession in my work, the first and the one to which I have remained the most faithful. I painted the same subject 19 years ago. By making a very careful comparison of the two pictures, everyone can study all the history of painting right there, from the linear charm of primitivism to stereoscopic hyper-aestheticism."

At 22, Dalí spent four months on the 1926 painting The Basket of Bread, of which he said: "by the power of its density, the fascination of its immobility, creates the mystical, paroxysmic feeling of a situation beyond our ordinary notion of the real. We are at the borderline of dematerialization of matter by the sole power of the mind."

The loaf of bread, painted and completed in Monterey, California in 1945, he described to Luis Romero as "the most esoteric and the most Surrealist of anything I have painted to date," where the painting is even more dynamic [than the 1926 version] by having the basket of bread placed on the edge of the table, giving a strong sense of forthcoming "borderline of dematerialization".

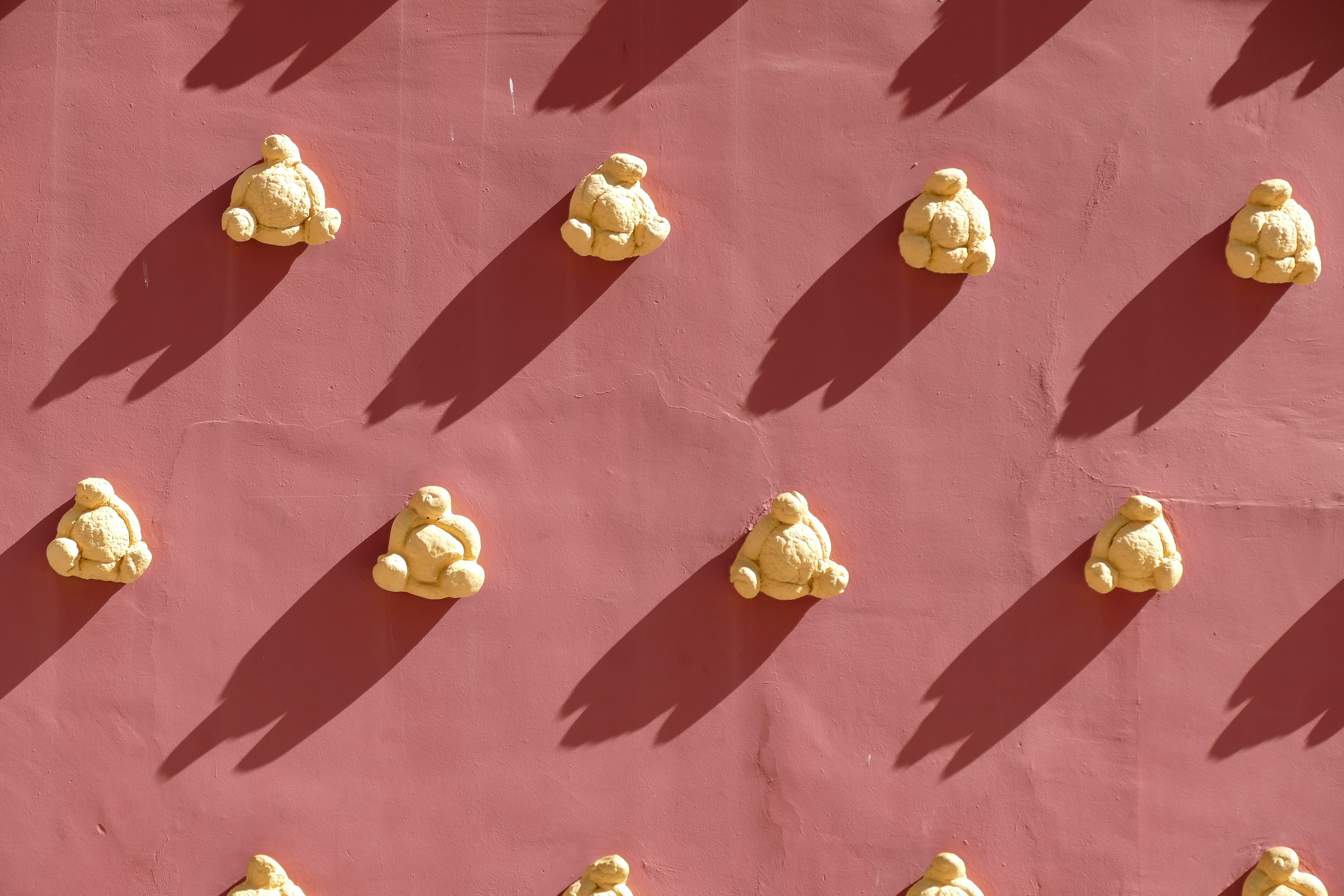
One of the façades of the Teatro-Museo Dalí is decorated with reproductions of a typical Figueres bread.

In the catalog of his exhibition at Bignou Gallery, New York in late 1945, Dalí's entry for the portrait Galarina draws attention to how Gala Dalí's crossed arms resemble the basket and her naked breast resembles the bread, and how Gala has become his bread basket.

== Political context ==
Dalí wrote in the Bignou Gallery of New York catalogue that he painted Basket of Bread in two months, when "the most staggering and sensational episodes of contemporary history took place" and finished "one day before the end of the war".

The painting's subtitle, Rather Death than Shame, takes on special significance during this time period. The basket is situated on the edge of the uncovered table, against a starkly black backdrop, an omen to its own sacrificial destruction.

Adolf Hitler, a well-recorded subject by Dalí, shot himself before he could be captured on April 30, 1945. In Dalí's essay, "The Conquest of the Irrational" written in 1935, Dalí speaks of a "moral hunger" of the modern age that the German people sought relief through Hitler and National Socialism. Dalí writes that Hitler's followers were "systematically cretinized by machinism" and "ideological disorder", in which they "seek in vain to bite into the senile and triumphant softness of the plump, atavistic, tender, militaristic, and territorial back of any Hitlerian nursemaid." Further, this "irrational hunger is placed before a cultural dining table on which are found only ... cold and insubstantial leftovers." Hitler portrayed as the heel of a loaf of bread, on the edge of a precipice, sums up Dalí's opinion of Hitler and his ultimate demise.

The painting was also said by Dalí to have been painted the week the atomic bombs fell on Japan. "My objective was to arrive at the immobility of the pre-explosive object", Dalí revealed.

== Marshall Plan ==
Basket of Bread was used for the European Recovery Program, better known as the Marshall Plan from 1947 to 1951. The Marshall Plan, which earned General George C. Marshall the Nobel Peace Prize, is credited with rebuilding European nations by restoring agricultural and industrial production and thereby restoring food supply and economic infrastructure in the aftermath of World War II.

== Popularity and current location ==
In the 1940s, William Nichols, managing editor of This Week, a syndicated Sunday magazine, saw the picture in an art gallery. Finding it one of the most charming paintings he had ever seen he printed it in his magazine, giving Dalí his first mass audience. This Week Magazine, at one time had a circulation of 15 million, the largest in the world.

The painting resides in Figueres Teatre-Museu Dalí, containing the broadest range of works of Salvador Dalí (1904–1989), managed by the Gala-Salvador Dalí Foundation.

== See also ==
- List of works by Salvador Dalí
