= The Basket of Bread =

1926 painting by Salvador Dalí

- Artist: Salvador Dalí
- Year: 1926
- Medium: Oil on canvas
- Dimensions: 31.75 cm × 31.75 cm (12.5 in × 12.5 in)
- Location: Salvador Dalí Museum, St. Petersburg, Florida

The Basket of Bread is a painting by Spanish surrealist Salvador Dalí. The painting depicts four pieces of bread with butter on them sitting in a basket. One is separated from the others and is half-bitten. The basket sits on a white cloth. The painting is in the Dali Museum (St. Petersburg FL).

The painting was completed in 1926 when Dalí was twenty-two years old, shortly after he had finished his formal art class in Madrid where he was studying the Dutch Masters. It is among the earliest of several paintings of bread by Dalí; a later example is Basket of Bread (1945).

== See also ==
- List of works by Salvador Dalí
- The Milkmaid (Vermeer)
