= Counterpart fund =

A counterpart fund is a fund established as part of an arrangement for converting foreign aid (often supplied in $US) into an account in the domestic currency of an aid-recipient country. Counterpart funds were used by the UNRRA, and the Marshall Plan in the rebuilding of Western Europe after the Second World War, and today remain a common technique for delivering development assistance.

One method of setting up a counterpart fund is to, first, arrange for businesses in the aid-recipient country that want to import goods pay for imports in local currency. The aid-recipient government can then use foreign assistance (still perhaps in $US) to pay for the goods. This makes importing easier because it is usually easier to make payments in $US than in local currencies. Import funds supplied by donor countries are also often tied to imports from the donor countries. Trade agreements are often arranged so that imports can only come from the nation that provides assistance. This approach benefits the donor's export industry.

Another method for establishing counterpart funds is for goods (such as food aid) to be donated to an aid-recipient nation. The recipient government can then sell the goods and use the proceeds (received in local currency) to set up a counterpart fund.

In these ways, the recipient government can establish counterpart funds in local currency. These payments are amalgamated into a fund that is used to further fund development spending.

Further spending can take the form of investments in infrastructure or industry, paying down the debt or deficit, or stabilizing the currency. The investment of these funds can take the form of loans rather than grants, creating a permanent pool of investment capital. For instance, Germany's Marshall Plan counterpart funds were used to set up such an investment fund, and it is still in operation today.

== Example ==
Suppose, in 1949, a German construction company had wished to purchase an American crane for reconstruction efforts in Germany. In a counterpart fund arrangement, company would have bought the crane from the West German government in Deutschmarks. The Deutschmarks would then have been deposited into the central bank. The Economic Cooperation Administration (ECA), the body mediating counterpart funds, would have paid the American crane exporter in $US authorized under the European Recovery Program (ERP). Meanwhile, the Deutschmarks would have been used to finance an ECA-approved recovery project.

There were several benefits to this transaction. First, instead of a direct transfer of an asset or converting currency for imports, this system incentivized participation in the economy (in this case, Germany) using local currency. For the German construction company, the entire transaction occurred in West Germany and was arranged by the fledgling government. Furthermore, because the payment was in local currency, there was no negative effect on the West German balance of payments, which was a major concern of the ERP. Lastly, instead of resorting to inflationary policies as had often been done in post-war recoveries, the central bank had an inflow of currency to lend for projects.
