= Committee of European Economic Co-operation =

1947 joint European conference

- Abbreviation: CEEC
- Formation: July 12, 1947; 78 years ago
- Founded at: Paris
- Dissolved: September 22, 1947; 78 years ago
- Type: Governmental organization
- Purpose: Economic Co-operation
- Headquarters: Quai d'Orsay
- Location: Paris

The Committee of European Economic Co-operation (CEEC) was a joint European conference to determine the priorities for the recovery of the European economy after World War II, and to assist in the administration of the Marshall Plan. The committee, consisting of representatives from 16 European nations, met from 12 July to 22 September 1947 in Paris, France.

The conference resulted in a request from those nations of Europe that participated in the deliberations of the committee, which did not include the Soviet Union and her satellite states, for a total of US$22.4 billion (323 billion in 2025) over a four-year period.

From the viewpoint of today, one of the most tangible result from the activities of the CEEC was the establishment in 1948 of the Organisation for European Economic Co-operation (OEEC) to administer the Marshall plan from the European perspective. The OEEC is the precursor to today's Organisation for Economic Co-operation and Development (OECD).

== Background ==
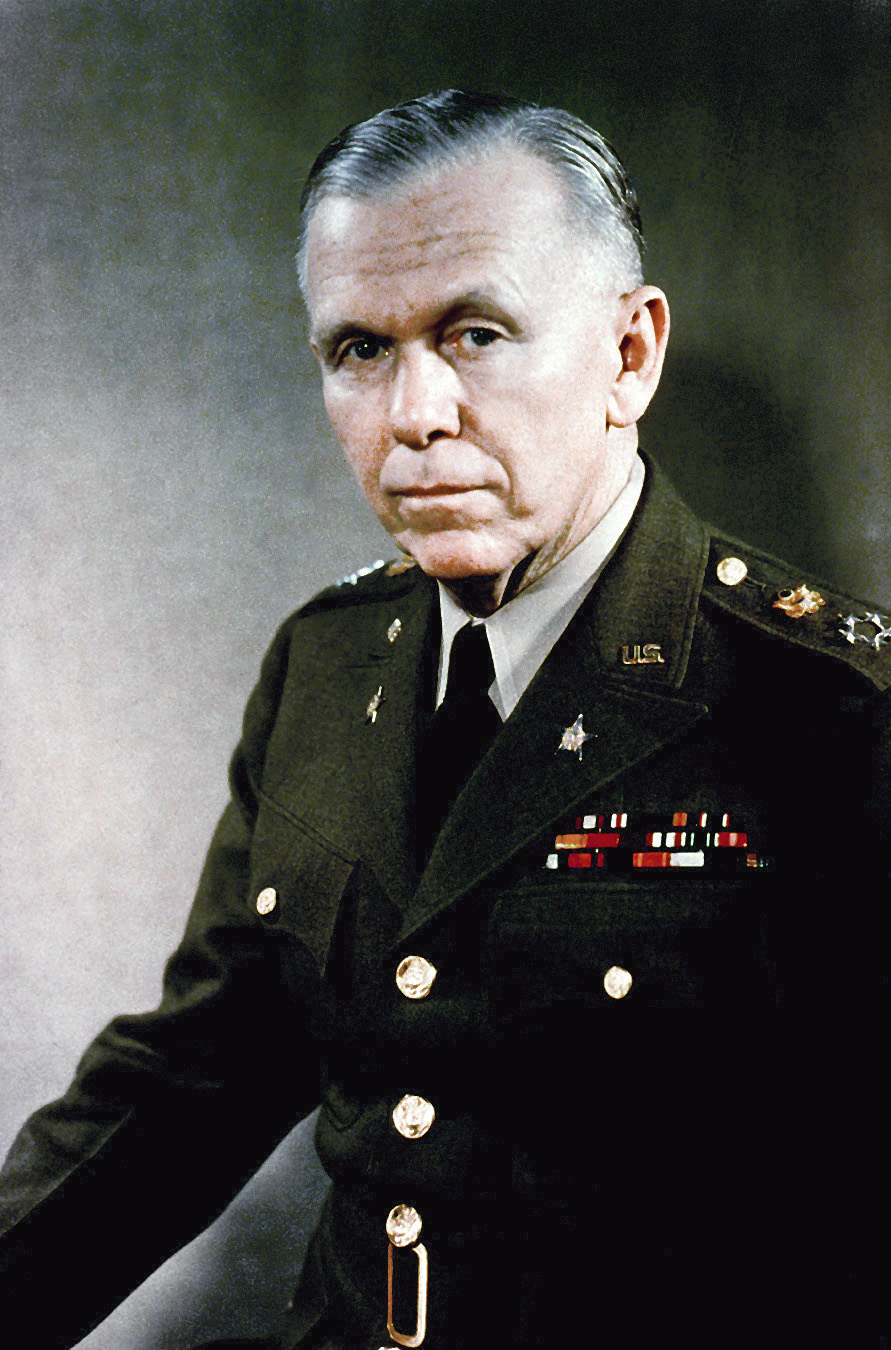
George C. Marshall

On 5 June 1947, George C. Marshall, at the time Secretary of State of the United States of America, gave an address at Harvard University in Cambridge, Massachusetts, where he proposed a plan to aid European recovery after the events of World War II, in the form of financial and economic assistance from the United States. This assistance, however, was dependent on the co-operation of the European nations who would be the recipients of this aid. The countries involved would need to agree on their requirements, as well as to their own contributions to European recovery.

It is already evident that before the United States Government can proceed much further in its efforts to alleviate the situation and help start the European world on its way to recovery, there must be some agreement among the countries of Europe as to the requirements of the situation and the part those countries themselves will take in order to give a proper effect to whatever actions might be undertaken by this Government.

In addition, Marshall made it clear that the United States insisted that this program for Europe must be drafted and put into action by joint European agreement.

It would be neither fitting nor efficacious for this Government to undertake to draw up unilaterally a program designed to place Europe on its feet economically. This is the business of the Europeans. The initiative, I think, must come from Europe. The role of this country should consist of friendly aid in the drafting of a European program and of later support of such a program so far as it may be practical for us to do so. The program should be a joint one, agreed to by a number, if not all, European nations.

=== European reaction ===
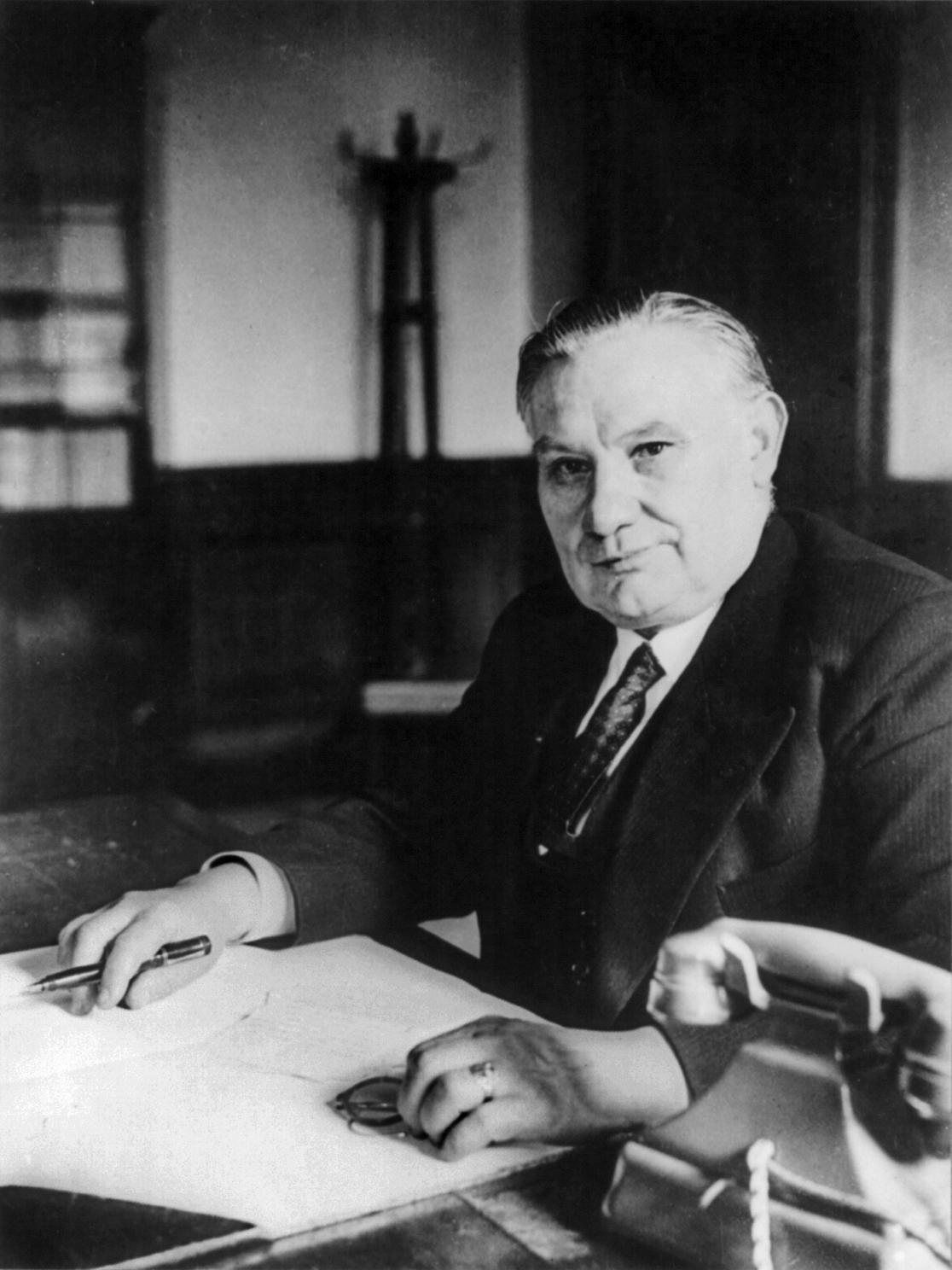
British Foreign Secretary Ernest Bevin

On 14 June 1947, the French Foreign Minister, George Bidault, invited his British counterpart, Ernest Bevin, to Paris to discuss the proposal by the United States. Reports indicated that the Soviet Union had been contacted to gauge whether they were interested in participating in this meeting. On 17 June 1947, the two foreign ministers, along with subject matter experts, commenced a meeting to discuss tariffs and trade barriers, monetary reforms, and aid priorities. That same day, the British ambassador to the Soviet Union met with Soviet Foreign Minister Vyacheslav Molotov to discuss the Marshall Plan with the Soviet leadership. On 19 June, the meeting in Paris was broken off, and a formal invitation to participate in further discussions was sent to Molotov.

The "Big Three Conference" began on 27 June 1947, involving France, Great Britain, and the Soviet Union. This meeting soon revealed basic disagreements between France and Great Britain on one side, and the Soviet Union on the other, leading to the breakdown of discussions on 2 July. That same day, France and Great Britain announced their intention to consider the Marshall Plan further, with or without participation of the Soviet Union. The foreign ministers of the two countries therefore issued a formal invitation on 3 July 1947 to 22 European nations to participate in a "committee of co-operation" to detail the requirements and production capabilities of Europe, with 16 nations accepting this invitation by 10 July.

=== United States preparations ===
On 22 June 1947, in order to be prepared for the official response to Marshall's speech by the countries of Europe, President Harry S. Truman established three committees to study the aspects of the aid program and its impact on the American economy, namely the Council of Economic Advisers, also called the Nourse Committee after its chairman, Edwin Griswold Nourse, the Krug Committee, named after its chairman, Julius Albert Krug, and the Harriman Committee, named after its chairman, W. Averell Harriman.

=== Soviet Union reaction ===
The first reaction by the Soviet Union was delivered on 15 June 1947 in an editorial in Pravda, the official Communist Party organ, denouncing the proposal as an attempt by the United States to interfere in the internal affairs of sovereign nations. Five days later, however, the Soviet press indicated that the Soviet leadership was interested in further details of the proposed aid plan, and on 23 June 1947, Foreign Minister Molotov accepted an invitation to meet with France and Great Britain. After the breakdown of the Big Three Conference and the departure of Molotov from Paris, the Soviet Union persuaded its satellite countries (Poland, Hungary, Romania, Bulgaria, Yugoslavia, and Czechoslovakia) and neighboring Finland to refuse the invitation to join the European co-operation committee.

== Committee of European Economic Co-operation ==
The discussions on the details of the Marshall Plan (officially called the European Recovery Program, or ERP) counted 16 European participating nations: Austria, Belgium, Denmark (with the Faroe Isles and Greenland), France, Greece, Iceland, Ireland, Italy (with San Marino), Luxembourg, Netherlands, Norway, Portugal (with Madeira and the Azores), Sweden, Switzerland (with Liechtenstein), Turkey, and the United Kingdom. On 12 July 1947, 48 diplomats representing those 16 nations started meetings at Quai d'Orsay in Paris, France, with an invitation to the Soviet Union and her satellite states to join the conference in progress. The Committee of European Economic Co-operation was also known as the Conference of Sixteen, referencing its 16 participant nations, and was chaired by the British Foreign Secretary, Ernest Bevins.

Parallel to the efforts of the 16 European nations on the subject of the Marshall Plan, the Soviet Union pushed ahead with efforts to form trade pacts and bilateral agreements with its satellite states. These agreements came to be called the 'Molotov Plan'.

In the initial draft plan for the activities of the committee, the final report due date was set for 1 September 1947. The general report of the Committee of European Economic Co-operation, labeled Volume I, was finalized and sent to the United States on 22 September 1947. Volume II, containing reports by technical sub-committees, was delivered in October 1947.

During the deliberations of the committee, the CEEC agreed to several conditions laid out by the United States since the beginning of the conference, one of which was the formation of a continuing organization after the conclusion of the committee meetings. The CEEC would meet again on 15 March 1948 to plan a permanent organization to take on the tasks of jointly administering this aid and recovery program. This body would turn into the Organisation for European Economic Co-operation (OEEC) on 16 April 1948, which was the direct precursor of today's Organisation for Economic Co-operation and Development (OECD).

=== Report summary ===
The report of the CEEC addressed the details on the European aid and recovery program in terms of internal production efforts, European economic, financial, and monetary stability, joint economic co-operation, import needs, and balance of payments. The goal of the program was to achieve the return of normalcy to the European economy by 1951, and therefore called for a four-year effort of increasing productivity of both the agricultural and industrial sectors, which had suffered significant war damage, estimated to be between 20 and 85 percent, depending on country and sector. The report provided the estimated total cost of the program to be US$22.4 billion (323 billion in 2025), with the first-year cost for 1948 to be US$8.0 billion (115 billion in 2025). The report further broke down this amount by estimating that US$3.1 billion (44.7 billion in 2025) would be sought from the International Bank for Reconstruction and Development (IBRD), while the majority (US$19.3 billion (278 billion in 2025)) would be requested from the United States of America.

=== United States response ===
A report by the Harriman Committee, delivered to President Truman on 7 November 1947, estimated that the United States would only be able to export and deliver goods to Europe in the amount of US$5.75 billion (82.9 billion in 2025) for 1948, and that the total amount of goods, services, and credits supplied by the USA over the four-year period would amount to between US$12 and US$17 billion (between 173 billion and 245 billion in 2025).

On 19 December 1947, President Truman requested appropriations from Congress in the amount of US$17 billion (245 billion in 2025) for the period from 1 April 1948 to 30 June 1952, with US$6.8 billion (98 billion in 2025) to be appropriated for the period from 1 April 1948 to 30 June 1949.
