= Molotov Plan =

Soviet Union aid to rebuild the countries in Eastern Europe

Emblem of Council for Mutual Economic Assistance

The Molotov Plan was the system created by the Soviet Union in order to provide aid to rebuild the countries in Central and Eastern Europe that were politically and economically aligned to the Soviet Union.

It was called the "Brother Plan" in the USSR and can be seen as the Soviet Union's version of the Marshall Plan, which, for political reasons, Central and Eastern European countries would not be able to join without leaving the Soviet sphere of influence. However, the Molotov Plan cannot be considered a Soviet response to the Marshall's initiative, as the Soviet plan predated the American by about two years, having started operating in Central and Eastern Europe as early as 1945. Soviet foreign minister Vyacheslav Molotov rejected the Marshall Plan (1947), turning the Molotov Plan into the Soviet-sponsored economic grouping which was eventually expanded to become the Comecon. The Molotov Plan was symbolic of the Soviet Union's refusal to accept aid from the Marshall Plan, or allow any of their satellite states to do so because of their belief that the Marshall Plan was an attempt to weaken Soviet interests in their satellite states through the conditions imposed and by making beneficiary countries economically dependent on the United States (officially, one of the goals of the Marshall Plan was to prevent the spread of Communism). The plan consisted of a system of bilateral trade agreements which also established Comecon to create an economic alliance of socialist countries. This aid allowed countries in Europe to stop relying on American aid and therefore allowed Molotov Plan states to reorganize their trade to the Soviet Union instead. The plan was in some ways contradictory: at the same time the Soviets were giving aid to Eastern Bloc countries, they were demanding that countries who were members of the Axis powers (many of them Eastern Bloc countries themselves or a predecessor to an Eastern Bloc country) pay reparations to the Soviet Union. Thus, the Soviet Union has been receiving regular payments from Italy, Romania, Hungary, and Finland, setting up a payment plan of $900 million over 8 years.

The Molotov's program had set multiple objectives for itself. The maximum aims set were to obtain economic control over Europe, to adapt the European economy to its own, and to convert them into a market for the Soviet surpluses. The minimum aims consisted of establishing governments that are friendly, at least, to the Soviet Union. The technique that the Soviet government used was a network of trade agreements. Between 1945 and 1947, the USSR concluded eleven important agreements with its satellites. Those were mostly trade agreements in which the USSR was sending raw material and food (such as grain, coal, cotton, and metals) and receiving the manufacturing goods and equipment for its industries. When it comes to Germany, one other Soviet goal was to seek reparations from it, seeking hundreds of millions of dollars from East Germany's economy and having the Red Army live off of the land it was occupying, avoiding use of the USSR's domestic resources. Because of the high casualties and losses sustained during World War II, the Soviet Union did not refrain from taking what it could in Germany.

== List of nations which took part in the Molotov Plan ==
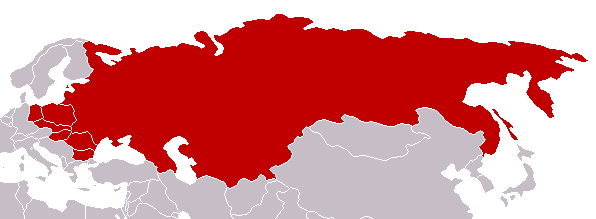
Map of Molotov Plan member states

- Soviet Union
- Poland
- Czechoslovakia
- Hungary
- Romania
- Bulgaria
- East Germany

== See also ==
- Invasion of Poland 1939
- Molotov–Ribbentrop pact
- Marshall plan
