= Ellie the Elephant =

Mascot for the New York Liberty

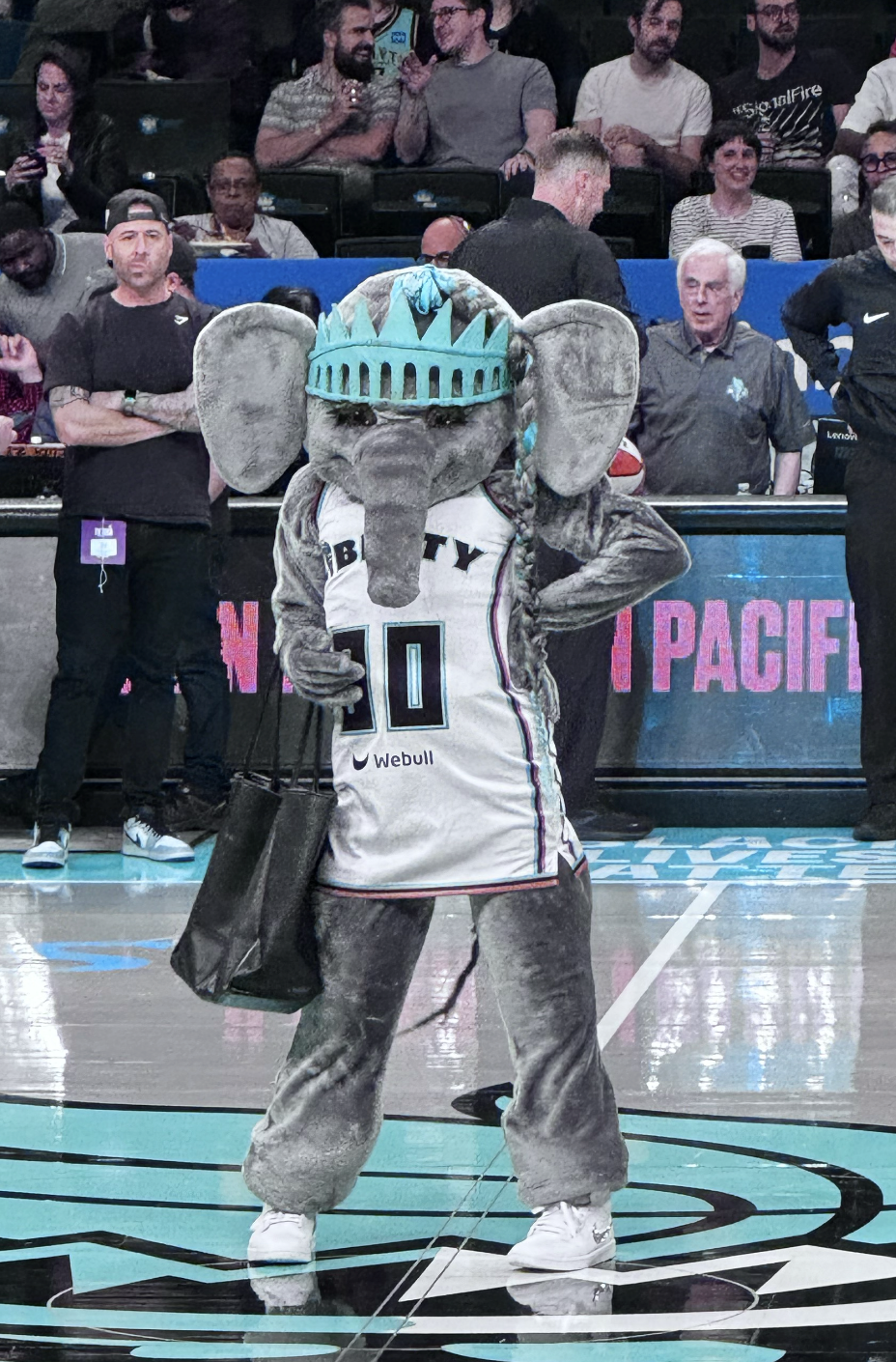
- Ellie The Elephant in 2024
- Team: New York Liberty
- Description: Female elephant
- First seen: May 6, 2021
- Website: liberty.wnba.com

Ellie the Elephant, also known as Big Ellie and Big Ellie Liberty, is the mascot for the New York Liberty of the Women's National Basketball Association (WNBA). Ellie was introduced on May 6, 2021, with the team's change in ownership and move to Barclays Center, replacing the previous mascot Maddie, a dog.

Ellie has received media coverage for her dance performances, including twerking. She has also been described as an important part of the game-day atmosphere at Barclays Center, and her popularity has attracted attention beyond the New York Liberty.

== Origins ==
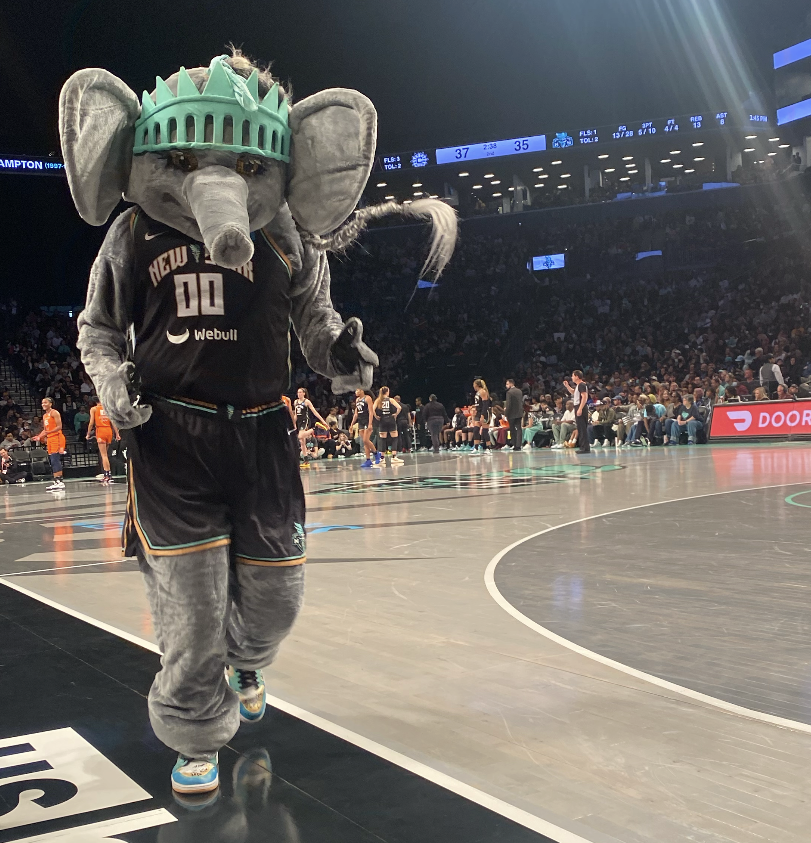
Ellie jogs the sideline at a New York Liberty game in her 2023 uniform.

When the ownership of the New York Liberty changed hands from James Dolan (owner of Madison Square Garden and the New York Knicks) to Clara Wu Tsai and Joe Tsai (owners of the Brooklyn Nets), the team moved to Barclays Center. The prior mascot for the Liberty, a dog called Maddie, was named after Madison Square Garden.

Preceding the Liberty's move to Brooklyn, CEO Keia Clarke researched animals that were commonly associated with New York City. The history of the Brooklyn Bridge's construction revealed that, upon completion of the bridge, a celebratory parade was held—P. T. Barnum's elephants (including Jumbo) walked across the Brooklyn Bridge to showcase the bridge's structural integrity. Clarke thus thought that an elephant could symbolize the team's own move to Brooklyn. The name Ellie is after Ellis Island, the historic welcome center for new immigrants, next door to Liberty Island, the home of the Statue of Liberty. The mascot wears a radiate crown in the style of the Statue of Liberty, as was also worn by the prior mascot Maddie.

== Creative Team ==
The performer who embodies the Ellie costume remains anonymous, but they are a Brooklyn native. As a mascot, Ellie does not use her voice with fans during games, or to the press during interviews, but as of 2024 features first-person voiceover narration on her TikTok. Ellie's main creative team are NY Liberty Chief Brand Officer Shana Stephenson, senior director of entertainment Criscia Long and senior entertainment manager Shenay Rivers, who are all black women. They oversee Ellie in addition to the Timeless Torches, the Torch Patrol, The Lil Torches, along with any outside performers. Ellie's personality reflects the Black and LatinX culture of Brooklyn, and the dominance of the team on the floor. Her creative team looked to New York hip-hop personalities for inspiration. The performer who embodies Ellie tried out at an open audition. Long and Rivers act as Ellie's Stylists, working with costumes Manager Alexis Leatherwood to customize her outfits with extras like Rhinestones or custom pieces. Ellie's purse has become a notable accessory, and she has brand deals with fashion houses like Telfar, Rare Breed, and UGG. The team has a special rate card for brand partnerships with Ellie, akin to the influencer deals in social media writ large. In 2024, Ellie released her own colorway of the Nike Sabrina 2.

Ellie's Character suit was built by Randy Carfagno of Randy Carfagno Productions In her first season, she had a hair bang and a typical mascot style shoes, with anatomically incorrect hand paws Her suit has evolved towards a more danceable shoe with traction pads on her hand so that she is able to perform more advanced dance moves. These modifications were at the request of the performer. Her hair has gone from a simple curl to a floor-length, seafoam-infused braid. The 2024 season saw Ellie wearing into a Jersey Dress and a wide array of designer handbags and Nike shoes. She has "lush eyelashes" and she frequently incorporates wigs and advanced costume changes.

Ellie's escorts who hold her bag and support her during game day are called The Stompaz.

== Notable performances and dance moves ==
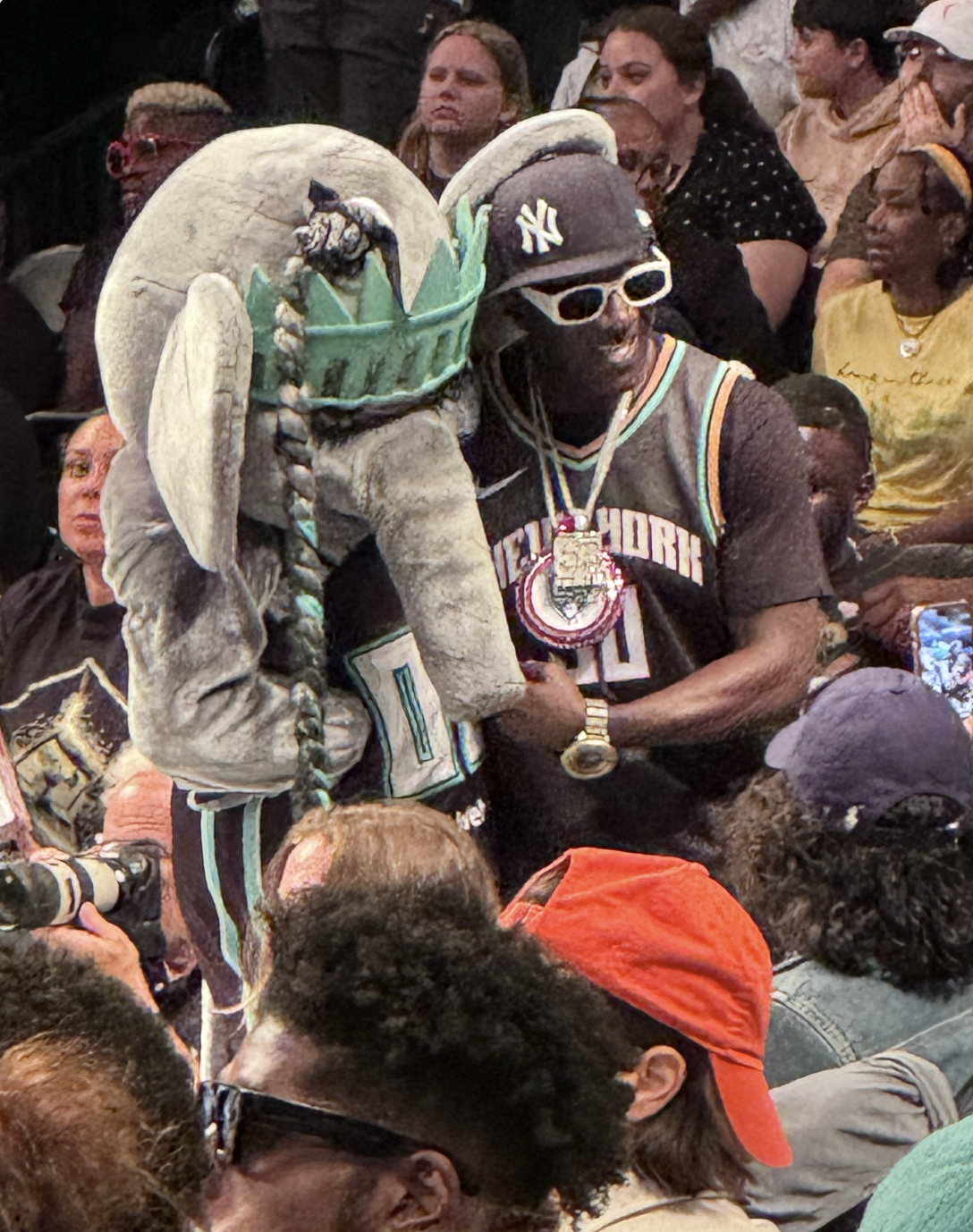
Ellie the Elephant with Flavor Flav at the New York Liberty game on September 5, 2024

In addition to her court-side antics, and dance moves she is famous for, Ellie has several signature crowd participation moments, including the Ellie Stomp, The Ellie Wave, and the "Gotta Get Up" song that plays during the late game t-shirt toss. Her skillfulness at twerking has been noted in the New York Times.

Ellie has performed notable halftime tributes to such artists as Lil Kim, Missy Elliott, Beyonce, Tyga, Mary J Blige, and others.

During the media tour after the Liberty's 2024 WNBA Championship win, Ellie graced the stage with Stephen Colbert, NBA Commissioner Adam Silver, New York Attorney General Leticia James, and Rappers Lil Mama, Fat Joe, and Remy Ma. New York City Mayor Eric Adams was made to hold her purse during a ceremony at New York City Hall while Ellie performed a dance breakdown.

== Recognition ==
At the 2024 Macy's Thanksgiving Day Parade, Ellie became the first professional sports mascot with a dedicated float in the annual spectacle, riding with The Timeless Torches, Breanna Stewart, Jonquel Jones, Nyara Sabally, and Betnijah Laney-Hamilton. In addition to winning a Glamour Women of the Year award, Ellie the Elephant was named one of 2024's 63 most stylish people by the New York Times, the only anthropomorphic character to make the list. New York Magazine's 2024 Year-End Approval Matrix featured Ellie all the way in the lower right corner, at the apex of "Lowbrow" and "Brilliant"

== See also ==
- Big Al (mascot)
- Bholu (mascot)
- Cultural depictions of elephants
- List of fictional elephants
- List of WNBA Mascots
- Welephant
