= The Elephants =

1948 painting by Salvador Dalí

- Artist: Salvador Dalí
- Year: 1948
- Medium: Oil on canvas
- Movement: Surrealism
- Dimensions: 49 cm × 60 cm (19 in × 24 in)
- Location: Private collection

The Elephants (Catalan: Els Elefants) is a 1948 painting by the Catalan surrealist artist Salvador Dalí.

== Background ==
The elephant is a recurring theme in the works of Dalí, first appearing in his 1944 work Dream Caused by the Flight of a Bee Around a Pomegranate a Second Before Awakening, and also in The Temptation of Saint Anthony and Swans Reflecting Elephants. The Elephants differs from the other paintings in that the animals are the primary focus of the work, with a barren graduated background and lack of other content, where most of Dalí's paintings contain much detail and points of interest (for example Swans Reflecting Elephants which is somewhat better known within Dalí's repertoire than The Elephants). The stork-legged elephant is one of the best-known icons of Dalí's work. Other examples are The space elephant (made of gold and gemstones) that Salvador Dalí designed in 1961 and the homonymous sculpture created in 1980.

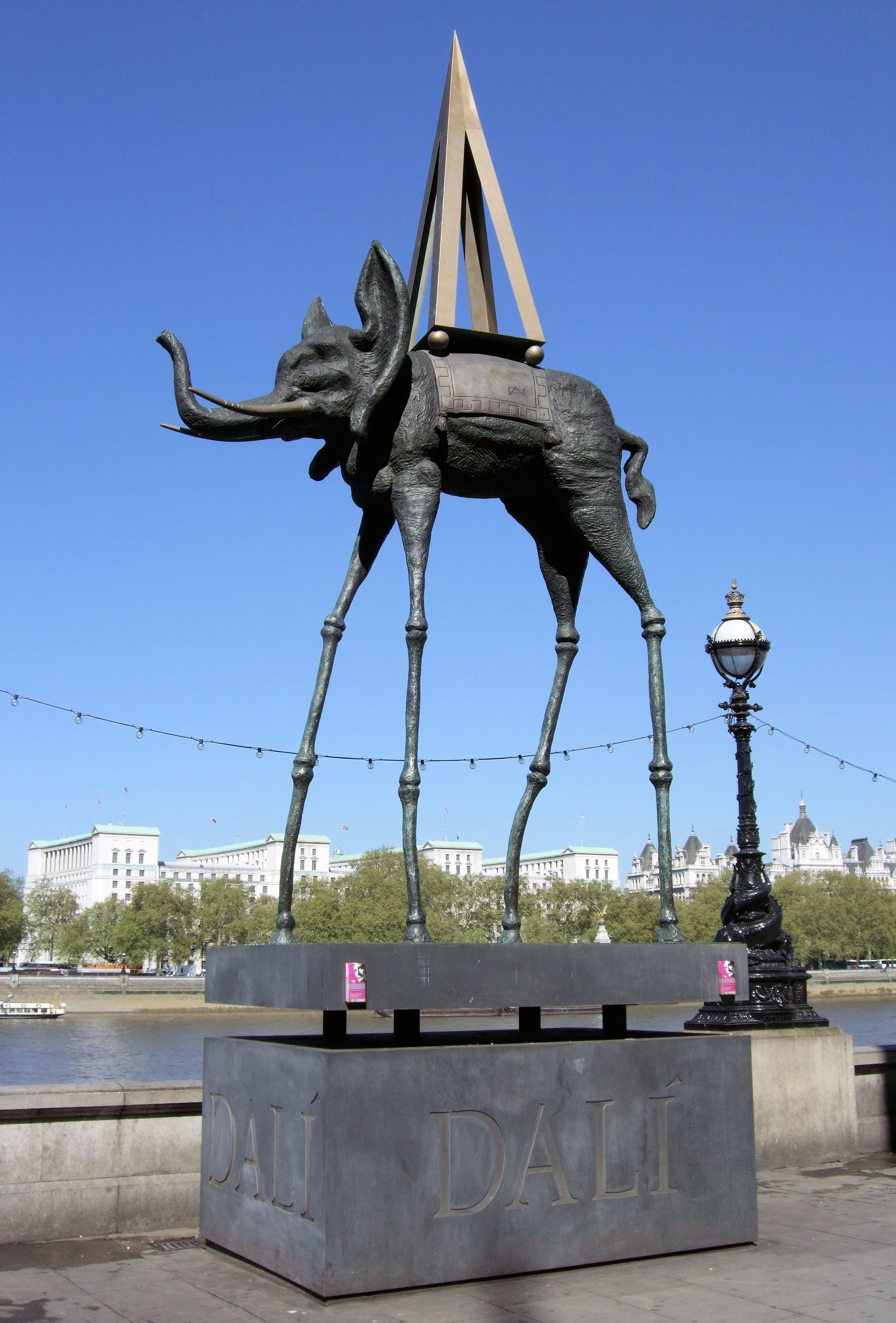
Space Elephant Statue by Salvador Dalí, South Bank, London (temporary exhibition).

== Symbolism ==
There are various cultural depictions of elephants, where they are often viewed as symbols of strength, dominance and power due to their bulk and weight. Dalí contrasts these typical associations by giving the elephants long, spindly, almost arachnid-like legs, once described as "multijointed, almost invisible legs of desire". Dalí believed in the power of dreams, influenced by Freudian psychoanalysis. In The Elephant, the elongated legs of the elephants have been interpreted as symbols of memory and its distortions. Dalí enhances the appearance of strength and weight by depicting the elephants carrying massive obelisks on their backs, however, on close inspection it can be seen that these weights are floating. The obelisks on the backs of the elephants are believed to be inspired by Gian Lorenzo Bernini's sculpture base in Rome of an elephant carrying an ancient obelisk, and was mentioned in several communications of the artist, so can be considered a reliable claim.

The Elephants is a good example of a surrealist work, creating a sense of phantom reality. "The elephant is a distortion in space", one critic explains, "its spindly legs contrasting the idea of weightlessness with structure"; "contrasting weight and space".

== See also ==
- List of works by Salvador Dalí
