= National Elephant Day (Thailand) =

Thai holiday

On 26 May 1998, the Thai government declared 13 March to annually be the Thai National Elephant Day or Chang Thai Day (Thai: วันช้างไทย). The observance was suggested by the Asian Elephant Foundation of Thailand and submitted to the Coordinating Subcommittee for the Conservation of Thai Elephants. The date was chosen because the Royal Forest Department designated the white elephant as the national animal of Thailand on 13 March 1963.

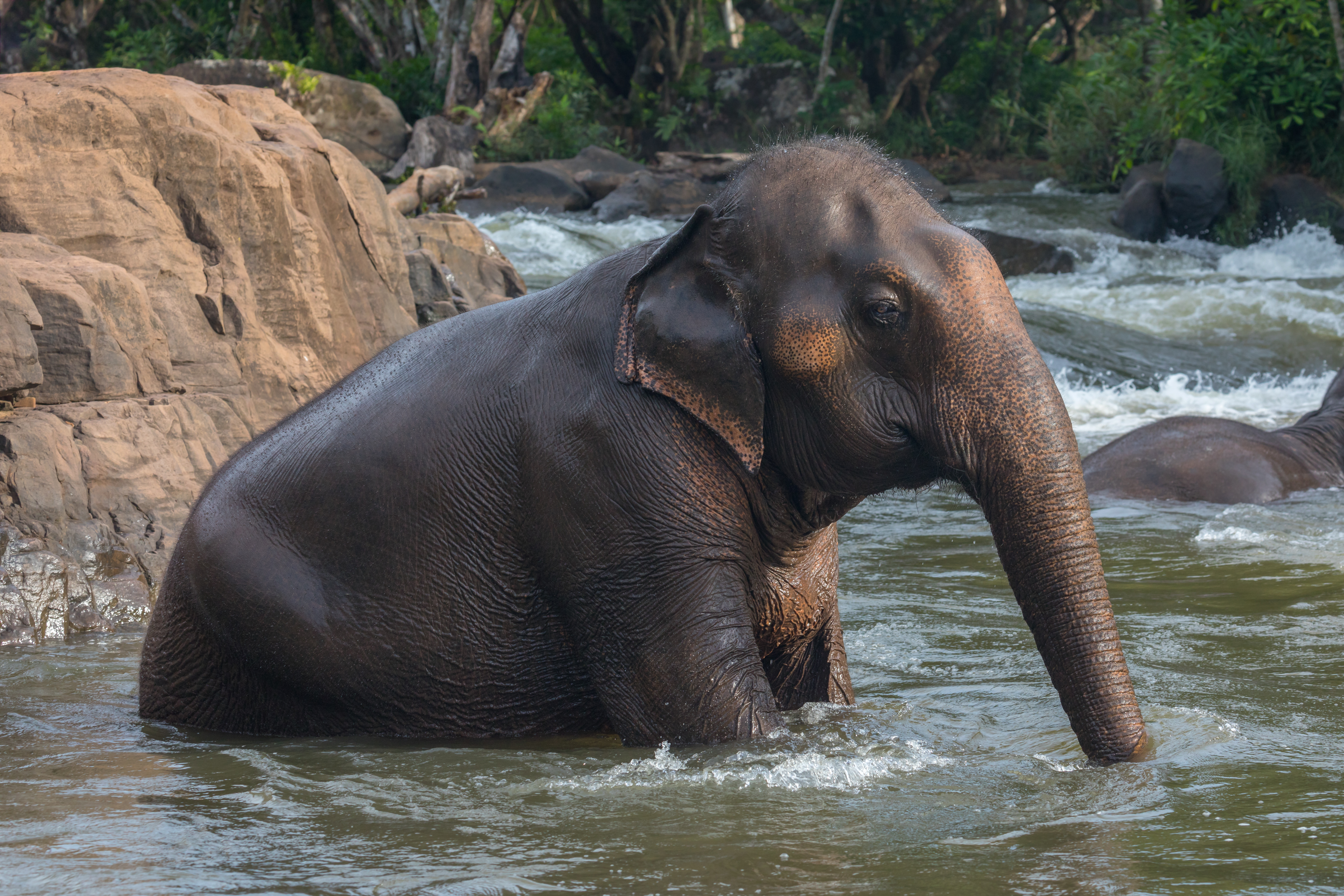
Asian elephant taking a bath

== Overview ==
Thai people have had a close-knit relationship with elephants since ancient times, with the elephant playing a significant role in transportation, labor and battle. Considered the national animal of Thailand, the elephant faced threats to its existence because of habitat invasion by humans and climate changes, amongst the other factors. The number of Thai elephants has been reduced from 100,000 to 2,000–3,000 wild elephants and about 2,700 domesticated elephants over the past 100 years. In Thailand, white elephants (ช้างเผือก, chang phueak) are considered sacred and are a symbol of royal power.

== Purpose ==
Chang Thai Day has three main purposes. The first is to show how significant elephants are to Thailand. The second is to demonstrate how the Thai culture depends on the elephants. Lastly, this annual celebration promotes awareness about protecting and conserving the Thai elephant population and its habitats.

== Activities ==
To raise awareness, activities take place around the nation. In Chiang Mai Province, activities include buffet luncheons for elephants, a traditional blessing ceremony and a special elephant show. These activities are organised by Chiang Mai University and the Maesa Elephant Camp.
