= Welephant =

Cartoon character

The National Fire Safety Charity for Children
- Type: Charitable trust
- Location: United Kingdom
- Website: http://www.welephant.co.uk

Welephant is a red elephant cartoon character with a fireman's helmet, originally used as a mascot by fire brigades in the United Kingdom to promote fire safety to children. Since 1989, however the character has become the mascot for the Children's Burn Trust.

Welephant returning from his retirement holiday in Basingstoke, Welephant provided Cracker with a few fire safety tips - and comedy poses. Last seen in the Isle of Wight

== Welephant Fire Safety Pledge ==
"Matches matches never touch, they can hurt you very much".

== Creation of Welephant ==
Welephant was created for the Greater Manchester Fire Service in order to promote awareness of the dangers of fire to the local school children. A competition was set where pupils of the local schools submitted drawings of a possible mascot that the fire department could use. The competition was won by 14 year old Susan Buttner, whilst she was a pupil at Oulder Hill High School, Rochdale.

== Going National ==
Through popular demand, Welephant went National and was used by fire & rescue services throughout the United Kingdom to promote fire safety to the pupils of primary schools in their local area.

== Charity Name Change ==
In 1996 Welephant Club Inc was changed to The National Fire Safety Charity for Children.

== Current status ==
Most Fire & Rescue Services now use their own individual mascots and cartoon characters to teach children about the importance of fire safety. During the late 1990s / early 2000s Welephant was gradually phased out from UK Fire Service merchandising and safety campaigns, but he continued to be used extensively as the Mascot for the National Fire Safety Charity

Since Welephant the popular BBC (until early 2008), HIT Entertainment and S4C Stop Motion/CGI Character Fireman Sam has been used by the UK Government in various fire safety campaigns aimed at young children.

Other characters such as 'Frances the Firefly', 'Adam Alarm' and others have also been used.

Welephant is currently the Mascot of the Children's Burn Trust.

In the fifth episode of the first series of the TV firefighting drama series London's Burning, Leading Fireman Malcolm Cross wears a Welephant costume for a fire station open day.
