= Dream Caused by the Flight of a Bee Around a Pomegranate a Second Before Awakening =

1944 painting by Salvador Dalí

- Artist: Salvador Dalí
- Year: 1944
- Medium: Oil on wood
- Movement: Surrealism
- Dimensions: 51 cm × 40.5 cm (20 in × 15.9 in)
- Location: Thyssen-Bornemisza Museum; Madrid

Dream Caused by the Flight of a Bee Around a Pomegranate a Second Before Awakening is a surrealist painting by Salvador Dalí, from 1944. A shorter alternate title for the painting is Dream Caused by the Flight of a Bee. The woman in the painting, dreaming, is believed to represent his wife, Gala, a regular presence in his work. The painting is held in the Thyssen-Bornemisza Museum, in Madrid.

== Description ==
It is an oil painting on wood. In this "hand-painted dream photograph", as Dalí generally called his paintings, there is a seascape of distant horizons and calm waters, perhaps Portlligat, amidst which Gala is the subject of the scene. Next to the naked body of the sleeping woman, which levitates above a flat rock that floats above the sea, Dalí depicts two suspended droplets of water and a pomegranate, a Christian symbol of fertility and resurrection. Above the pomegranate flies a bee, an insect that traditionally symbolizes the Virgin.

In the upper left of the painting what seems to be a yelloweye rockfish bursts out of the pomegranate, and in turn spews out a pouncing tiger that then spews out another pouncing tiger about to attack Gala and a rifle with a bayonet that is about to sting her in the arm. Above them is Dalí's first use of an elephant with long flamingo legs, found in his later compositions such as The Temptation of St. Anthony. The elephant carries on its back an obelisk, inspired by Bernini's Elephant and Obelisk in Rome's Piazza Santa Maria sopra Minerva.

== Themes and symbolism ==
The bayonet, as a symbol of the stinging bee, may represent the woman's abrupt awakening from her otherwise peaceful dream. This is an example of Sigmund Freud's influence on surrealist art and Dalí's attempts to explore the world of dreams in a dreamscape.

The elephant is a distorted version of the Piazza della Minerva sculpture Elephant and Obelisk by Gian Lorenzo Bernini facing the church of Santa Maria sopra Minerva in Rome. The smaller pomegranate floating between two droplets of water may symbolize Venus, especially because of the heart-shaped shadow it casts. It may also be used as a Christian symbol of fertility and resurrection. This female symbolism may contrast with the phallic symbolism of the threatening creatures.

It has also been suggested that the painting is "a surrealist interpretation of the Theory of Evolution."

In 1962, Dalí said this painting was intended "to express for the first time in images Freud's discovery of the typical dream with a lengthy narrative, the consequence of the instantaneousness of a chance event which causes the sleeper to wake up. Thus, as a bar might fall on the neck of a sleeping person, causing them to wake up and for a long dream to end with the guillotine blade falling on them, the noise of the bee here provokes the sensation of the sting which will awaken Gala." The guillotine anecdote refers to a dream reported by Alfred Maury in Le sommeil et les rêves ("Sleep and Dreams") and related by Freud in his 1899 book The Interpretation of Dreams.

== See also ==
- List of works by Salvador Dalí
