= Bholu (mascot) =

Mascot of Indian Railways

Bholu the Train Manager
- Created by: National Institute of Design
- Role: Mascot of Indian Railways
- Unveiled on: 16 April 2002

In-universe information
- Species: Elephant

Bholu the Train Manager (Train Guard) is the mascot of Indian Railways, represented as a cartoon of an elephant holding a signal lamp with a green lens in one hand. It was initially designed for the Indian Railways' 150th anniversary commemoration events and was unveiled on 16 April 2002 in Bangalore. In 2003, Indian Railways decided to permanently retain Bholu as its official mascot. A representation of Bholu was placed on the back side of an Indian coin.

== Background and Development ==
Railways were introduced in India on 16 April 1853, with a line from Bombay to Thane. To commemorate the 150th anniversary of the event, Indian Railways planned a series of events in 2002–2003 which included the launching of a mascot. Bholu the Train Manager was designed by the National Institute of Design in consultation with the Indian Ministry of Railways and was unveiled on 16 April 2002 in Bangalore. On that day, Bholu flagged off the Karnataka Express at 6.25 pm from platform number 1 of the Bangalore city station. According to the Indian Government (Railway Board)'s Manual for Public Relations Department (2007), Bholu was designated for official use effective 15 April 2002. Later, on 24 March 2003, they decided to retain Bholu as the official mascot of Indian Railways.

== Popularity ==
The mascot became very popular in India. When asked for their opinion on Bholu the Train Manager (Train Manager, previous Train Guard, a supervisory and non-gazetted post under Group C of Ministry of Railways, Government of India, Train Manager is a level 6/level 5+30% running allowance's post, whereas Senior Train Manager is a level 7/level 6+30% running allowance's post), Indian Railway officials said that Bholu is friendly and helpful. An Indian Government official release in 2003 described Bholu as an "ethical, responsible, sincere and cheerful icon". The green light in his hand symbolizes movement, the intention to travel with safety and positivism. In 2003 the Indian Government released a two-(₹) rupee coin which carried the impression of Bholu on its reverse side.
