= Joseph-Louis Duc =

French architect (1802–1879)

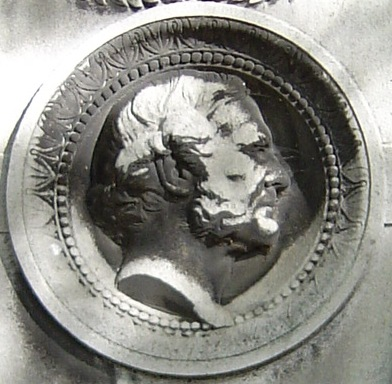
Medallion from his tomb at Montmartre Cemetery

Joseph-Louis Duc (French pronunciation: [ʒozɛf lwi dyk]; 25 October 1802 – 22 January 1879) was a French architect. Duc came to prominence early, with his very well received work at the July Column in Paris, and spent much of the rest of his career on a single building complex, the Palais de Justice.

== Biography ==
Born in Paris, Duc was educated at the École nationale supérieure des Beaux-Arts in Paris, where he was a student of Percier. Duc took the Prix de Rome in 1825 for a design of a proposed Paris City Hall. During his three-year stay at the Villa de Medici in Rome his associates there included Félix Duban, Henri Labrouste and Léon Vaudoyer.

Upon his return from Rome Duc's first significant commission was the decoration for the July Column, built from 1831 to 1840. Appointed as assistant to Jean-Antoine Alavoine, Duc took over the entire project on Alavoine's death in 1834. The foundation of the column is Alavoine's work; the column itself is acknowledged as solely Duc's work.

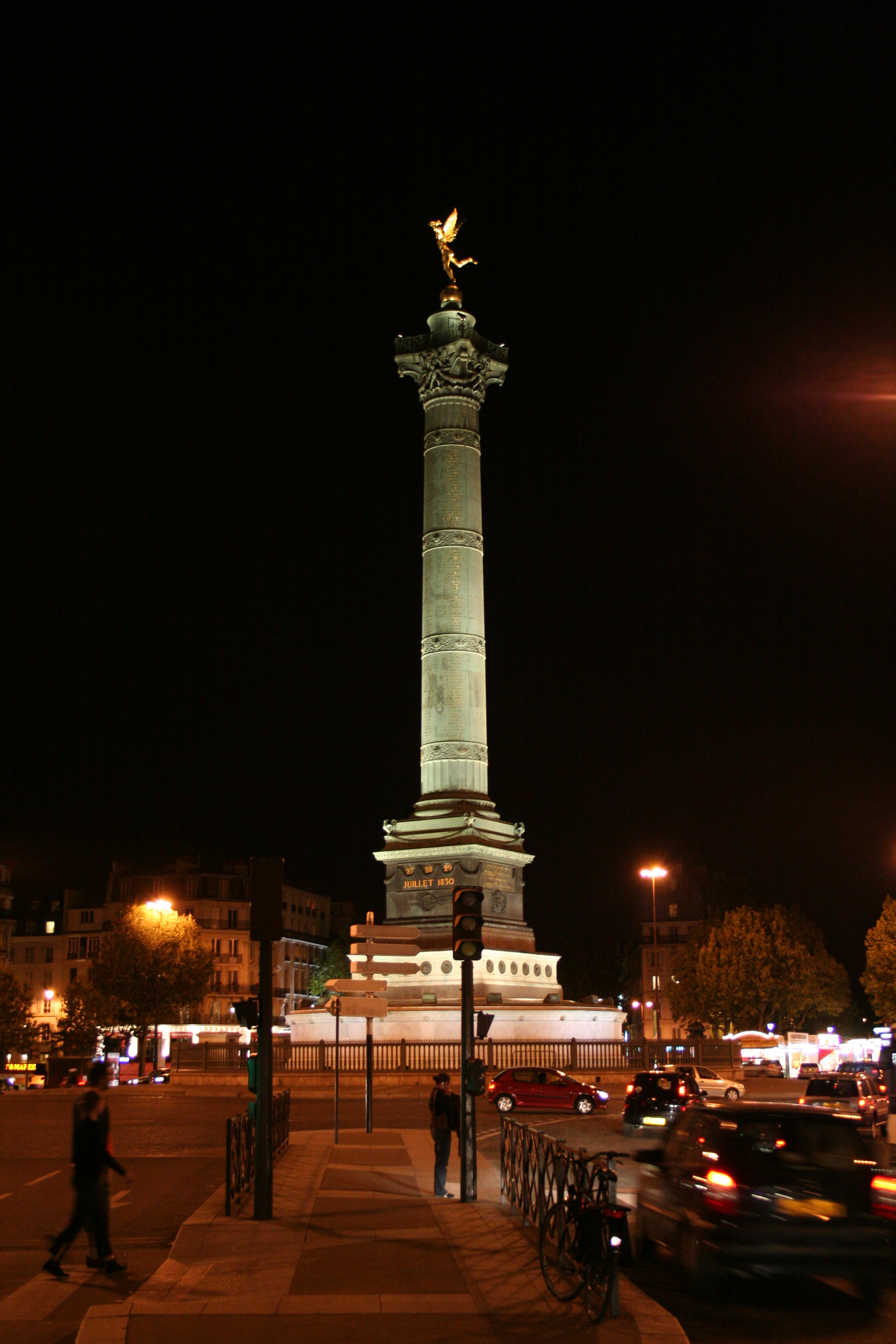
July Column, Paris, dedicated 1840

Immediately after the dedication of the July Column in mid-1840, Duc was awarded the position of architect for the Palais de Justice by the respected Antoine Vaudoyer, member of the Institut de France and father of Duc's friend, Léon. With the appointment Duc simultaneously was made a Knight of the Legion of Honor. Duc would spend his remaining thirty-nine years renovating and extending the Palais de Justice, for instance designing the Cour de Cassation. Almost completed at the time of the Paris Commune, the complex was burned on 24 May 1871 and partially destroyed.

Duc's other commissions, though rare, include the 1862 chapel of the small college Louis-le-Grand, now the Lycée Michelet, in Vanves.

Duc received the Royal Gold Medal from the Royal Institute of British Architects in 1876, was elevated to Commander of the Legion of Honor, and was elected to the Académie des beaux-arts in 1879. He is buried at Montmartre Cemetery.
