= Palais de Justice, Paris =

Courthouse in Paris, France

Coordinates: 48.855722°N 2.345051°E

Palais de Justice
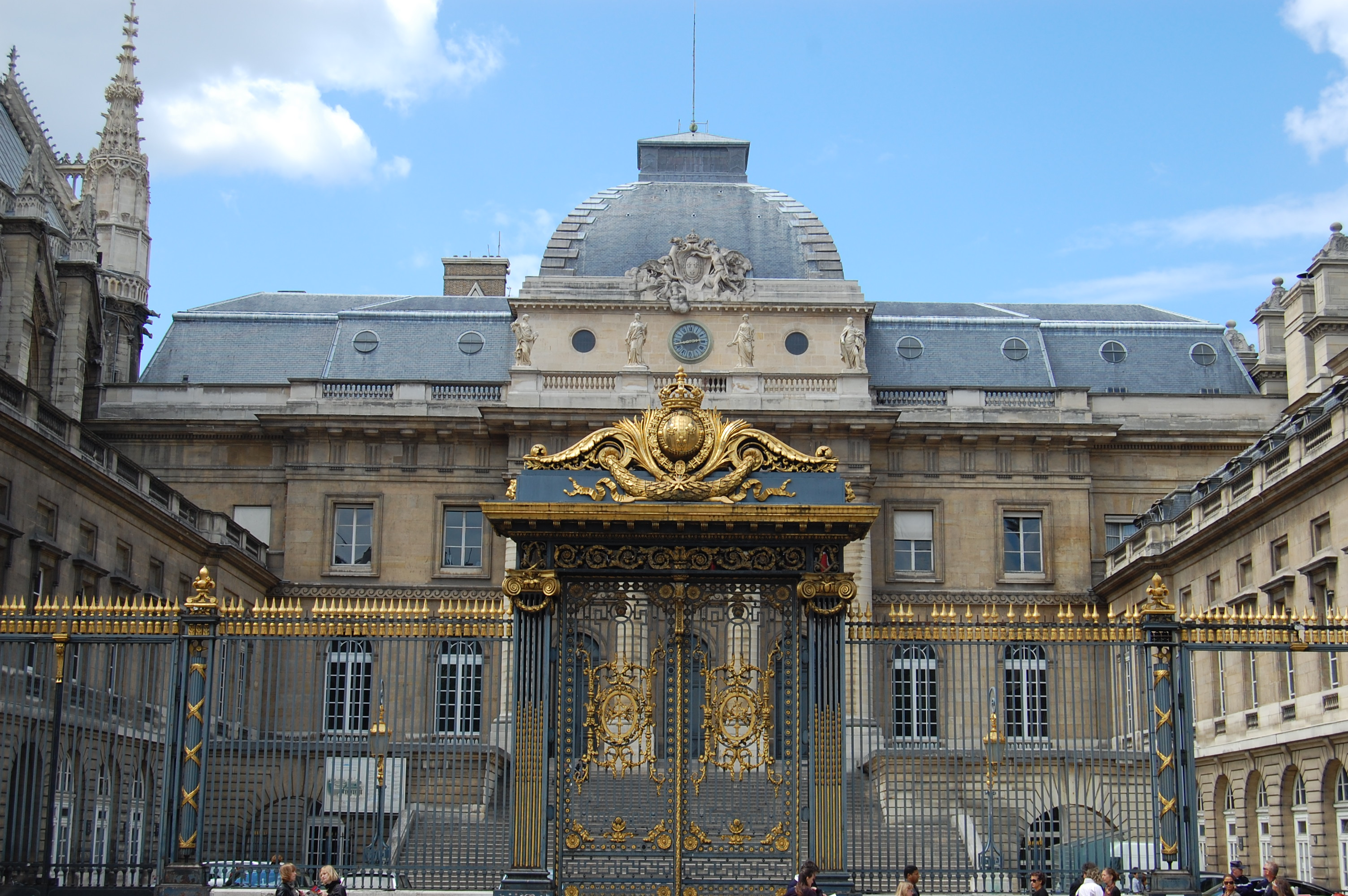
- Palais de Justice; gates of the cour d'honneur

General information
- Location: 1st arrondissement of Paris, France

The Palais de Justice (French pronunciation: [palɛ d(ə) ʒystis], lit. 'Palace of Justice') is a judicial centre and courthouse in Paris, located on the Île de la Cité. It contains the Court of Appeal of Paris, the busiest appellate court in France, and France's highest court for ordinary cases, the Court of Cassation. It formerly housed the Tribunal de grande instance de Paris which was relocated in 2018 to a new high-rise building in Paris's Batignolles neighbourhood.

The Palais de Justice occupies a large part of the medieval Palais de la Cité, the former royal palace of the kings of France, which also includes Sainte Chapelle, the royal chapel, and the Conciergerie, a notorious former prison, which operated from 1380 to 1914. It is located in close proximity to the Tribunal of Commerce, the Prefecture of Police of Paris, and the offices of the Paris Bar Association.

== History ==
=== Royal Courtroom to Revolutionary courtroom ===
Under King Robert II of France the Palais de la Cité began to serve as the home of a high court or council for the King. He constructed the Hall of the King, where the Curia Regis, or King's Council met. This was replaced by a much larger hall, the Grand Chamber, under Philip IV (1268–34). This enormous hall began to be used for theatrical performances, the meetings of the Parlement of Paris, a judicial body composed of the high French nobility.

In 1358, a Paris uprising led by the merchant Etienne Marcel caused the future king, Charles V of France, to depart Paris for safer quarters farther from the center of Paris; first at the Hôtel Saint-Pol, then near the Bastille, then the Louvre Castle. The judicial function, however, remained at the old palace. The Parlement of Paris, meeting in the Grand Chamber, was an appeals court for royal tribunals and the court of first instance in cases involving the nobility. Furthermore, its approval was required for royal ordinances. This gave it growing power in the feuds between the monarchy and the nobility. Louis XV attended his first court session there in 1715 at age five. The other judicial offices that remained were the Chambre des comptes and the Chancellery.

The very decorative gilded wrought iron grillwork and gateway were put in place in 1776. The façade and principal entrance of the palace, facing the Court of May, was entirely rebuilt between 1783 and 1786 with a neo-classical colonnade.

During the French Revolution, the Grand Chamber, where the Parlement of Paris had met, became the courtroom of the Revolutionary Tribunal, which rapidly tried and sentenced those accused of opposing the Revolution. Those convicted were usually taken to the guillotine the same day. In 718 days, up until 31 May 1795, the Tribunal sent 2,780 persons to the guillotine. Among the last to be executed was the Chief Prosecutor, Antoine Quentin Fouquier-Tinville, bringing the Reign of Terror to a close.

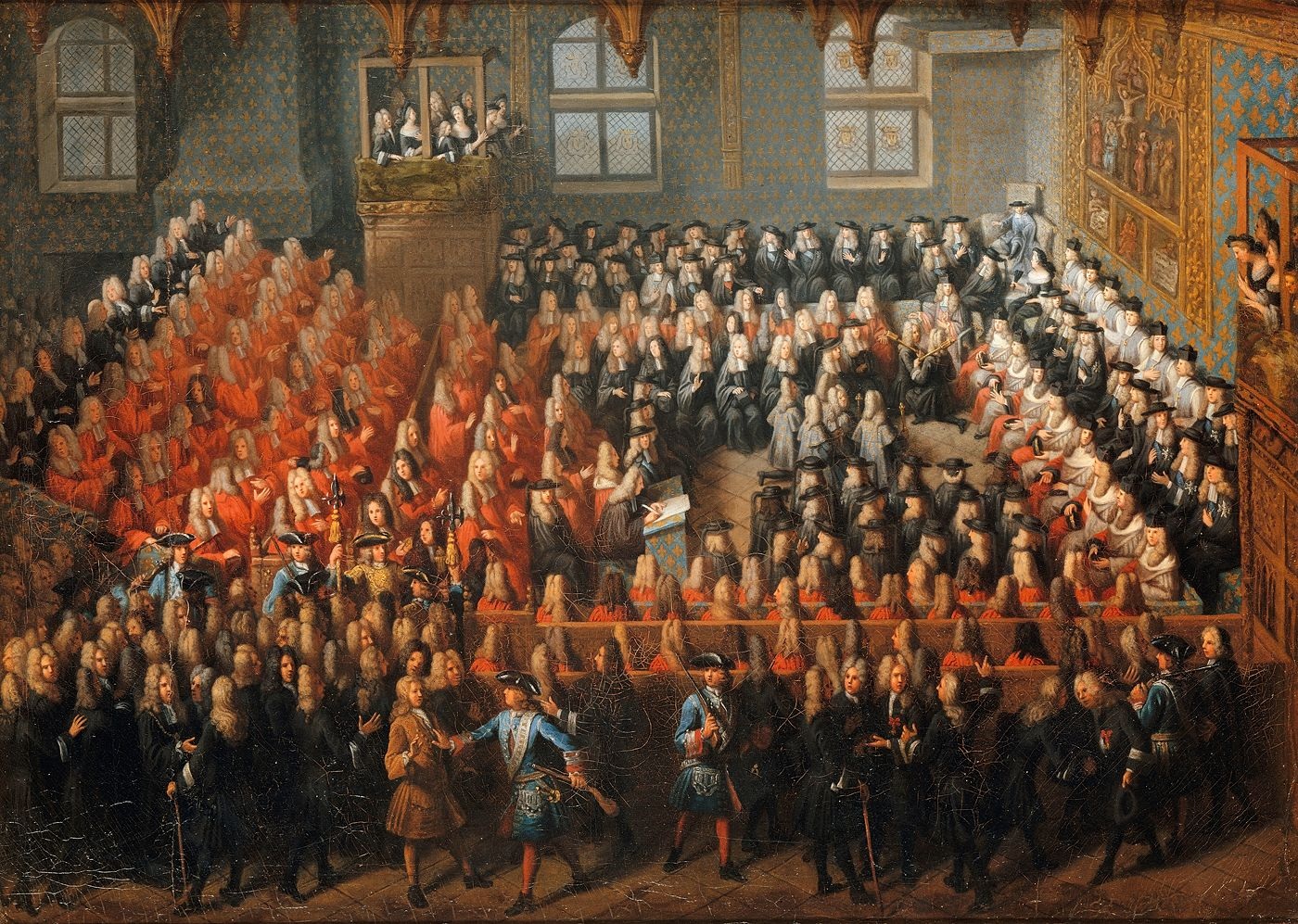
Lit de justice at the Parlement of Paris on 12 September 1715

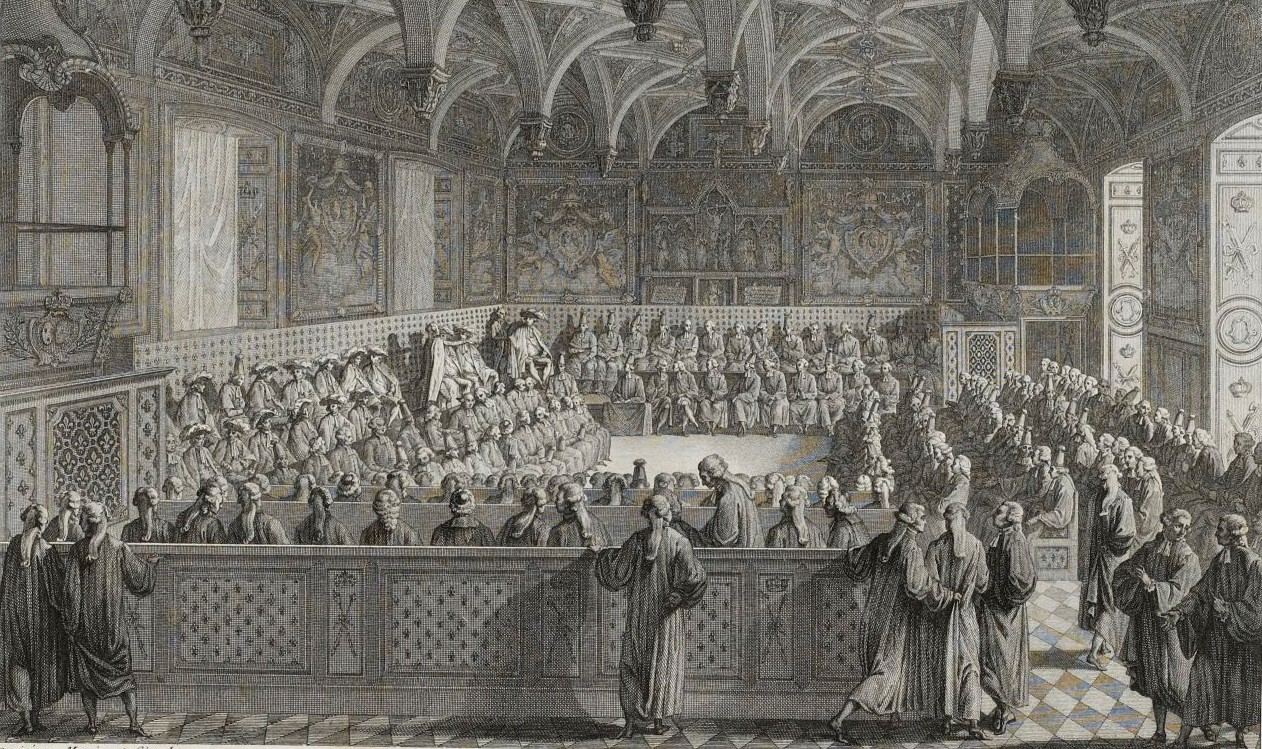
Lit de justice of the Parlement of Paris, attended by Louis XVI, in the Grand Chamber (19 November 1787)

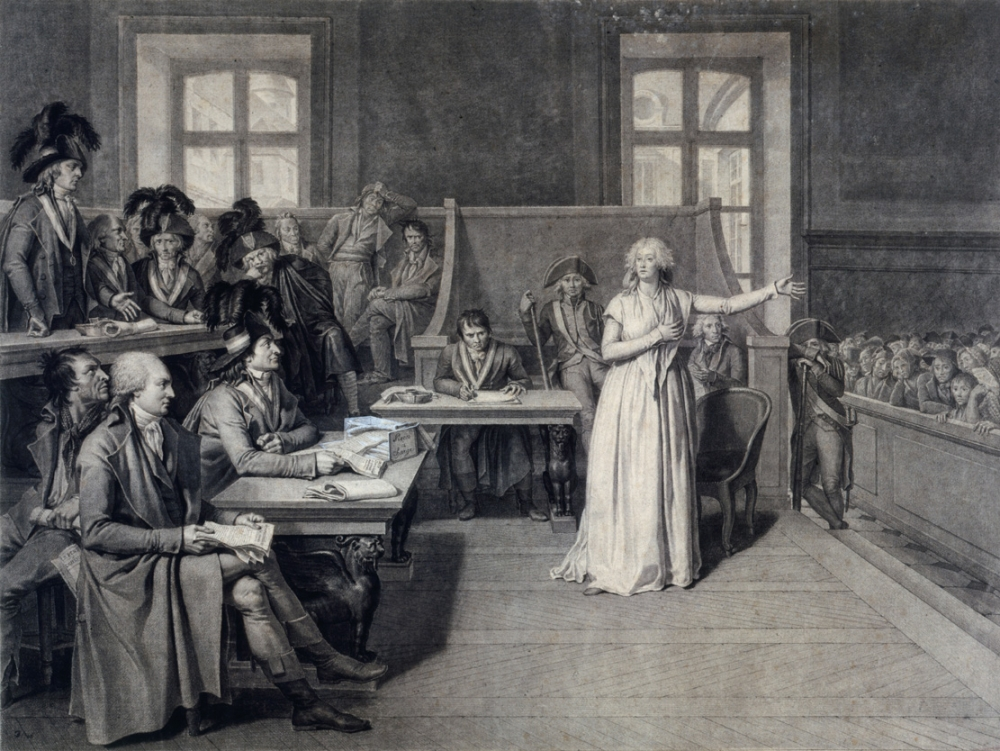
Marie Antoinette at the Revolutionary Tribunal, 15 October 1793

=== A new Palace of Justice (19th century) ===
In the first half of the 19th century, the palace became entirely devoted to the justice system. Under the reign of Napoleon Bonaparte, the Restoration and the July Monarchy, various projects were put forward for a new and larger structure. Between 1820 and 1828, the architect Antoine-Marie Peyre built a new façade between tower of the Horloge and the Tower of Bombec, and the access to the Conciergerie was moved to the Quai de Bombec.

Between 1837 and 1840, a new project for the building was developed by the architect Jean-Nicolas Huyot. Unlike most of the proposed structures, which were in the neo-classical style, with columns and pediments, Huyot's plan was neo-Renaissance. Unfortunately, on August 3, 1840, after all the final approvals had been received, Huyot died. Two weeks later the architects Joseph-Louis Duc and Etienne-Theodore Dommey were selected to build the structure. Construction took place between 1847 and 1871. The project included a new façade on the Boulevard de Paris, the restoration of the other buildings within the old palace, and a new building for the Cour de Cassation.

In March 1871, as the building was nearing completion, the Paris Commune seized power in the city. Work was abruptly halted. Then, in May, 1871, as the French army moved to take back the city from the Communards in what became known as the Semaine Sanglante ("Bloody Week”), arsonists from the Commune, rapidly losing ground to the French Army, set fire to the interior of the new building, almost entirely destroying it.

Shortly after 1871, the reconstruction resumed, under Duc and Honoré Daumet, and continued for more than twenty years. Duc completed the façade of Harlay, while Daumet rebuilt the Cour of Appeals. The work was finished by Albert Tournaire with the completion of the Tribunal correctionnel at the southeast corner, on the quai des Orfevres. The Conciergerie, beneath the palace, was opened to the public in 1914, and all prison functions in the building stopped in 1934.

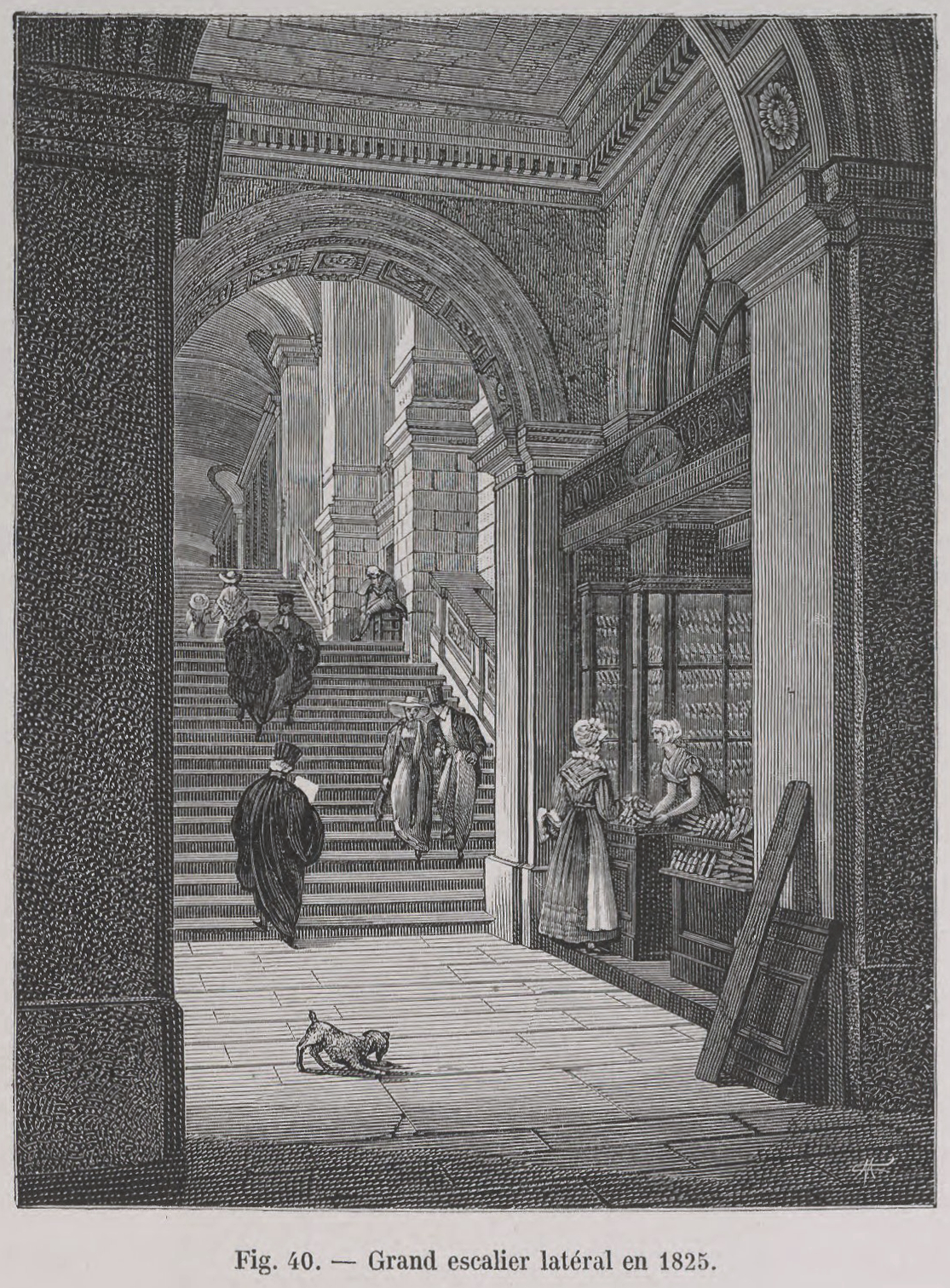
Grand lateral stairway in 1825

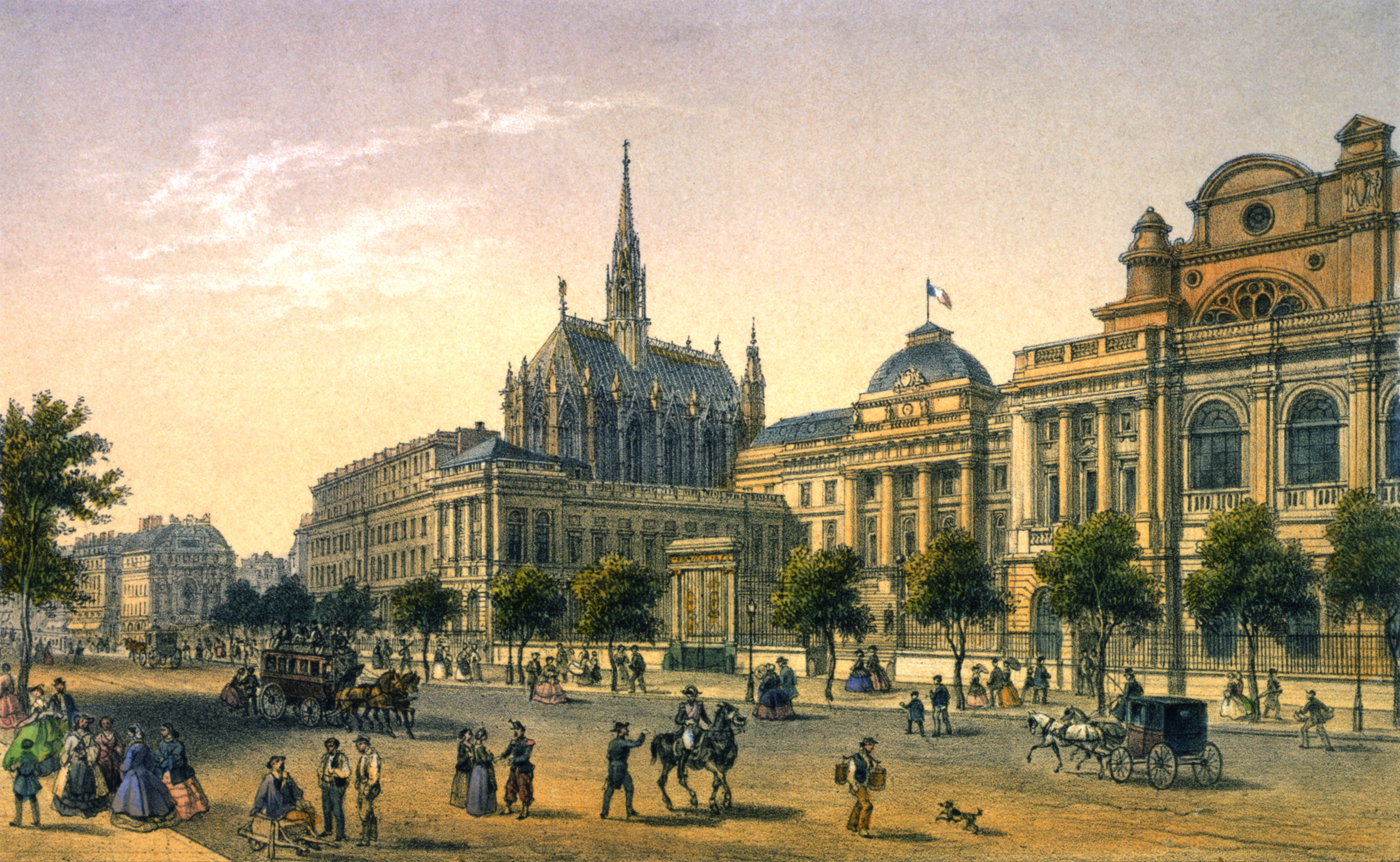
The Cour de May entrance of the Palace in the 1860s

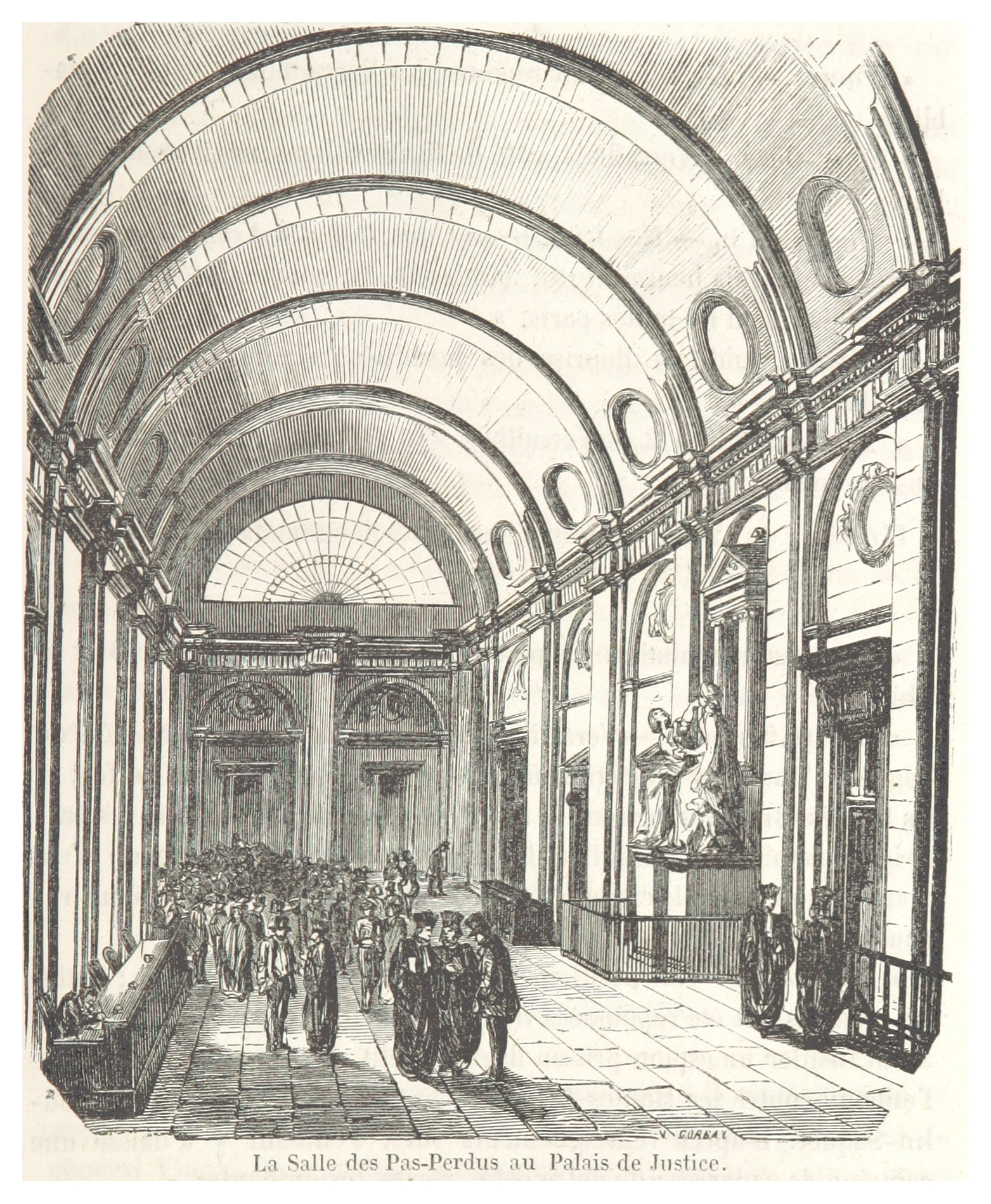
Hall of the "Pas Perdus" of the Palais de Justice (1870)

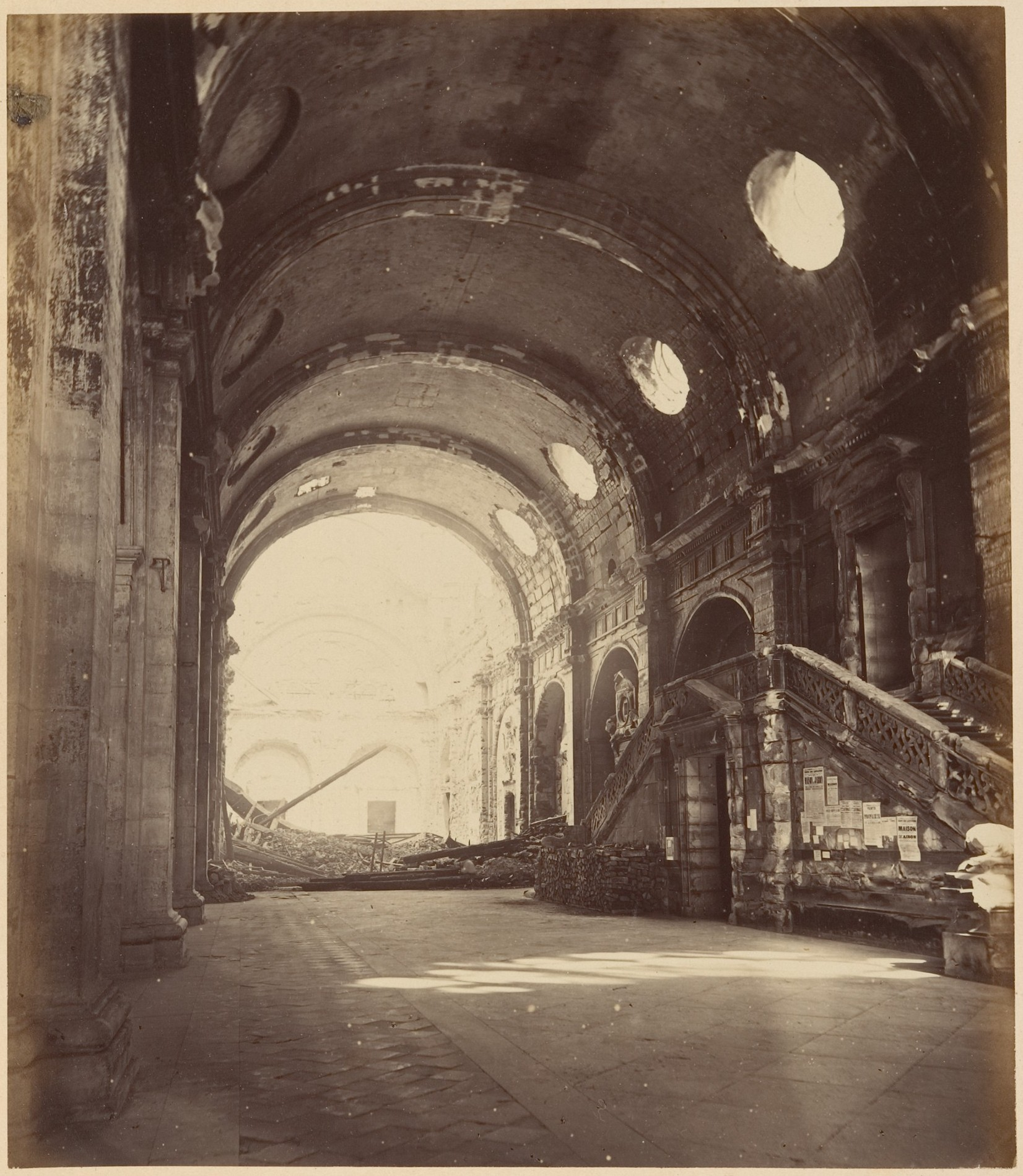
Hall of the Pas Perdus" after the arson of the palace by the Paris Commune during the "Semaine Sanglante", May 23, 1871

=== War Crimes, departures and transformation (20th-21st century) ===
In October 1945, after the end of World War II, the Palais of Justice courtrooms were used to try the highest French officials who had collaborated with the Nazi occupation. Those put on trial included the former prime minister Pierre Laval and Marshal Philippe Pétain. Laval was found guilty and was executed in October 1945 by a firing squad. Petain was also found guilty and sentenced to death, but due to his age and past service his sentence was reduced to imprisonment and then transfer to a hospital. He died at the age of 95 on July 23, 1951.

By the 21st century, the Palace of Justice had become too small for some of its functions. In 2018, the Tribunal judiciaire de Paris, the court formerly known as the Tribunal de grande instance de Paris, was moved to a modern high-rise tower, the Tribunal de Paris, by architect Renzo Piano at Batignolles, in the 17th arrondissement. The Tribunal d'instance petit (court of first instance) also moved to the new Tribunal de Paris effective January 1, 2020.

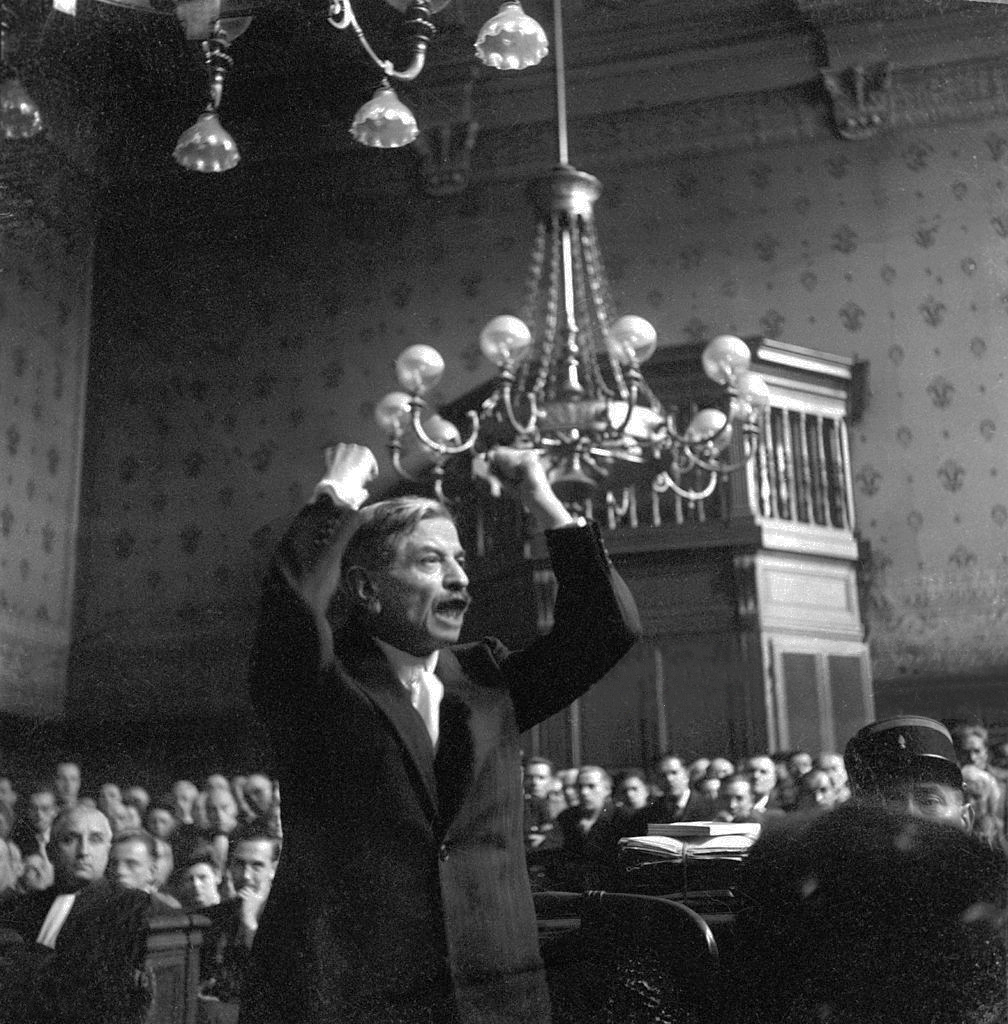
Trial of former prime minister Pierre Laval, October 1945

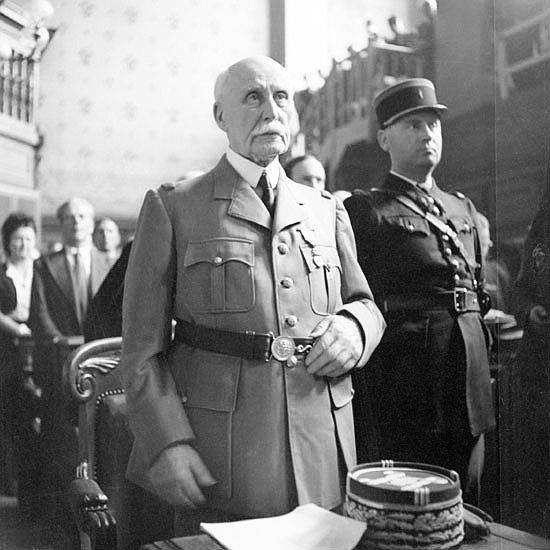
Trial of Marshal Philippe Pétain, 1945

== The Palace of Justice today ==
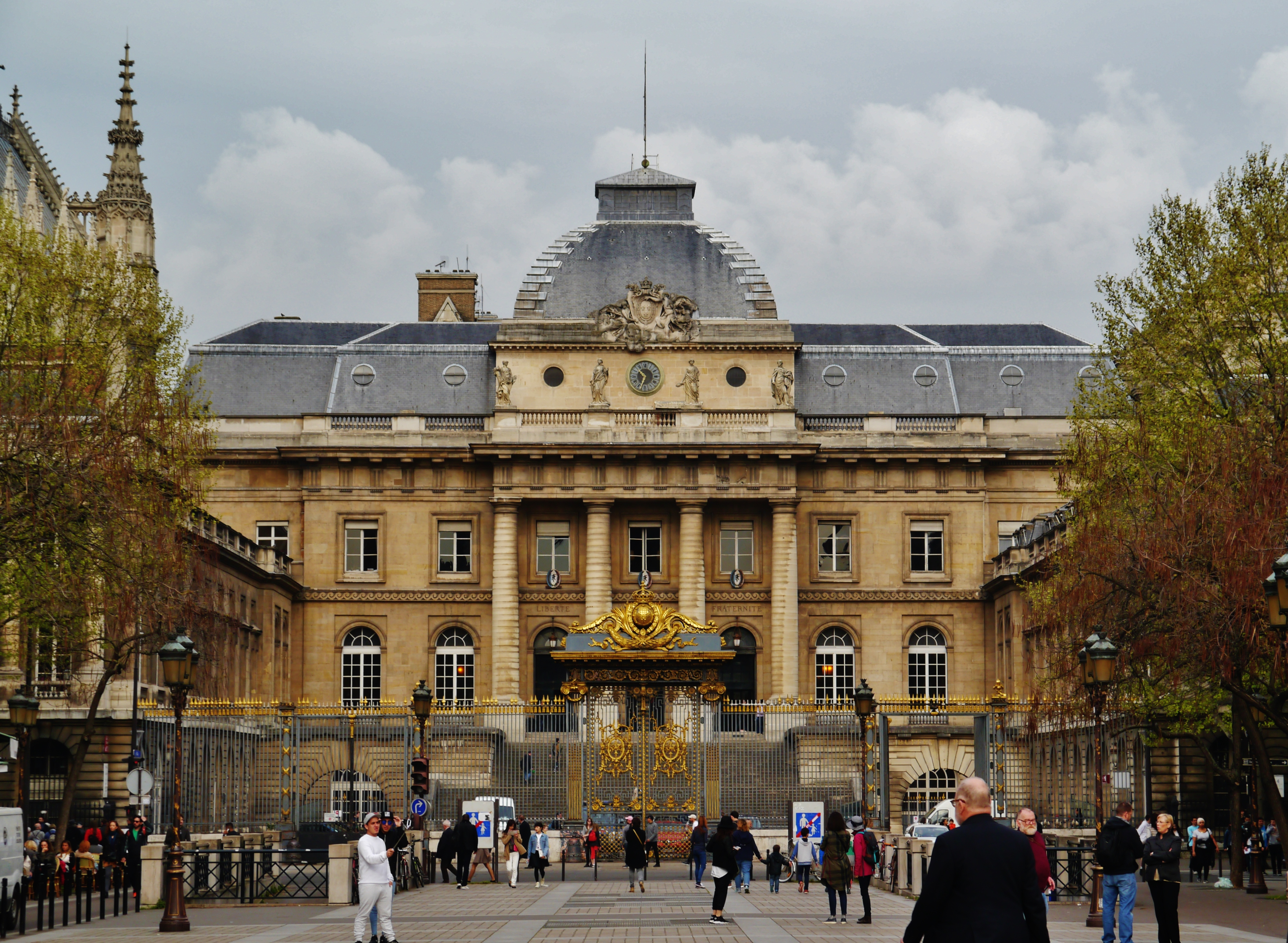
East entrance of the Cour de Cassation on the Cour de Mai (19th century)

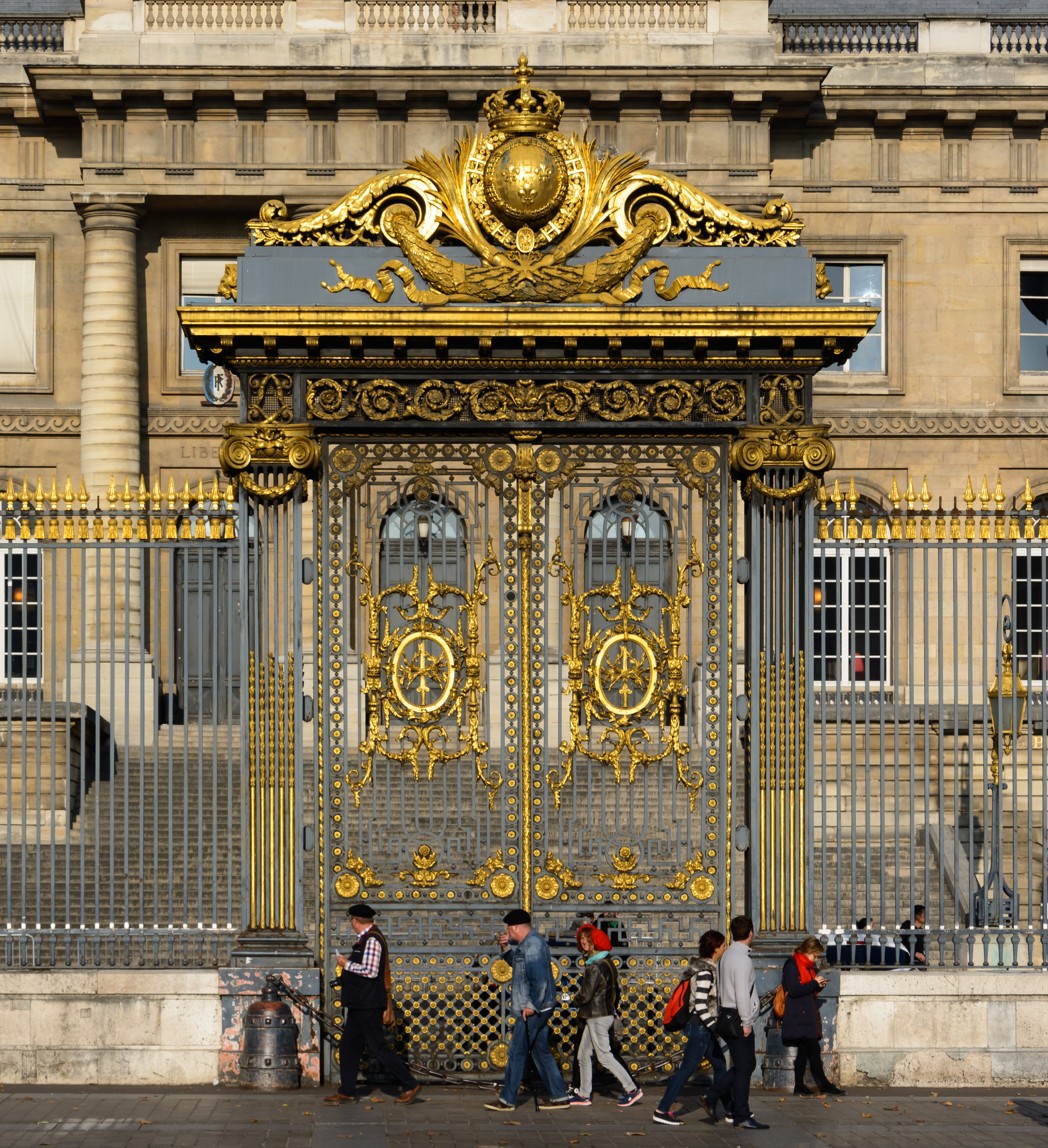
Detail of the gateway to the Cour de Mai, east front

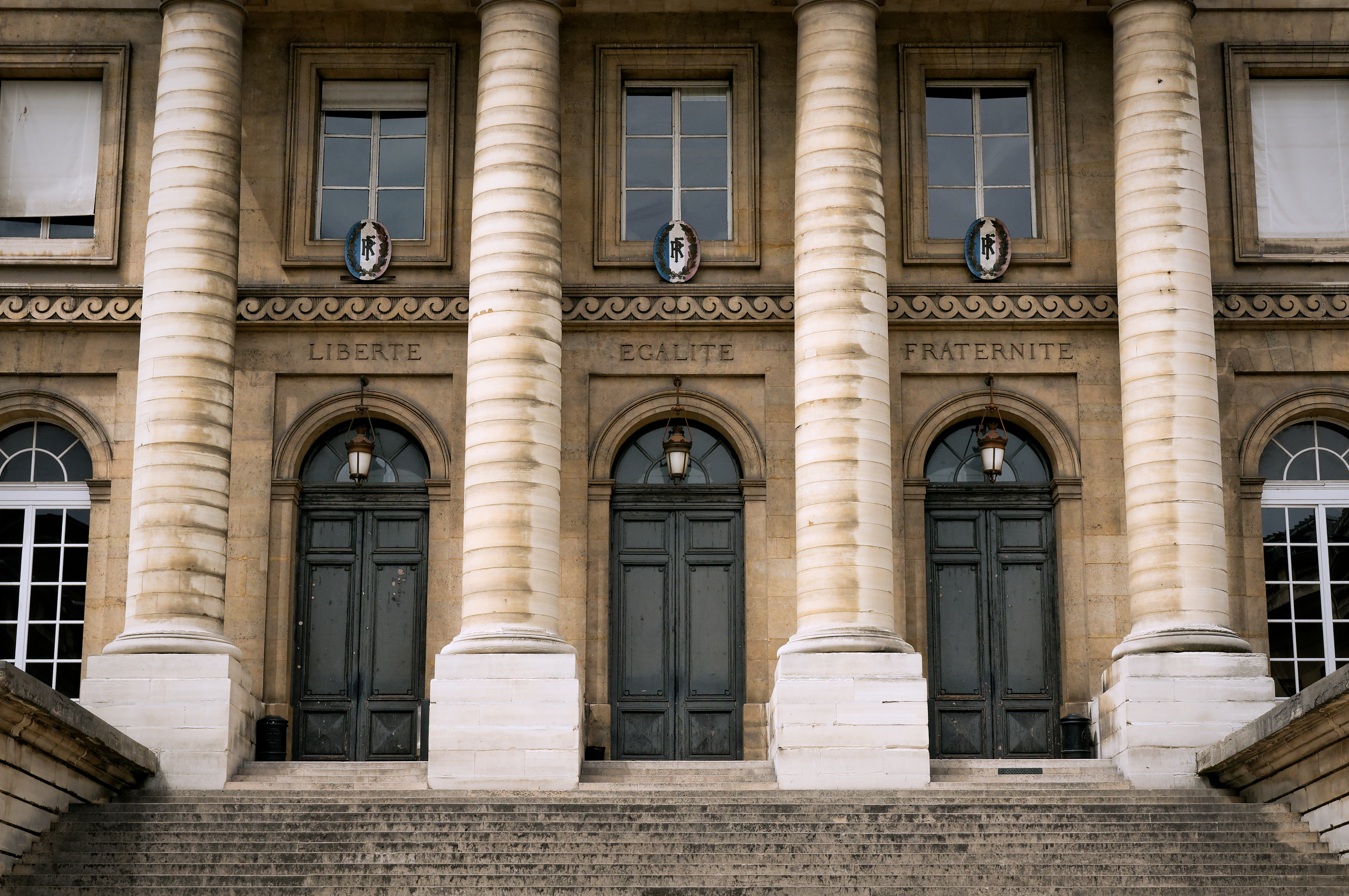
The national motto of France above the east entrance

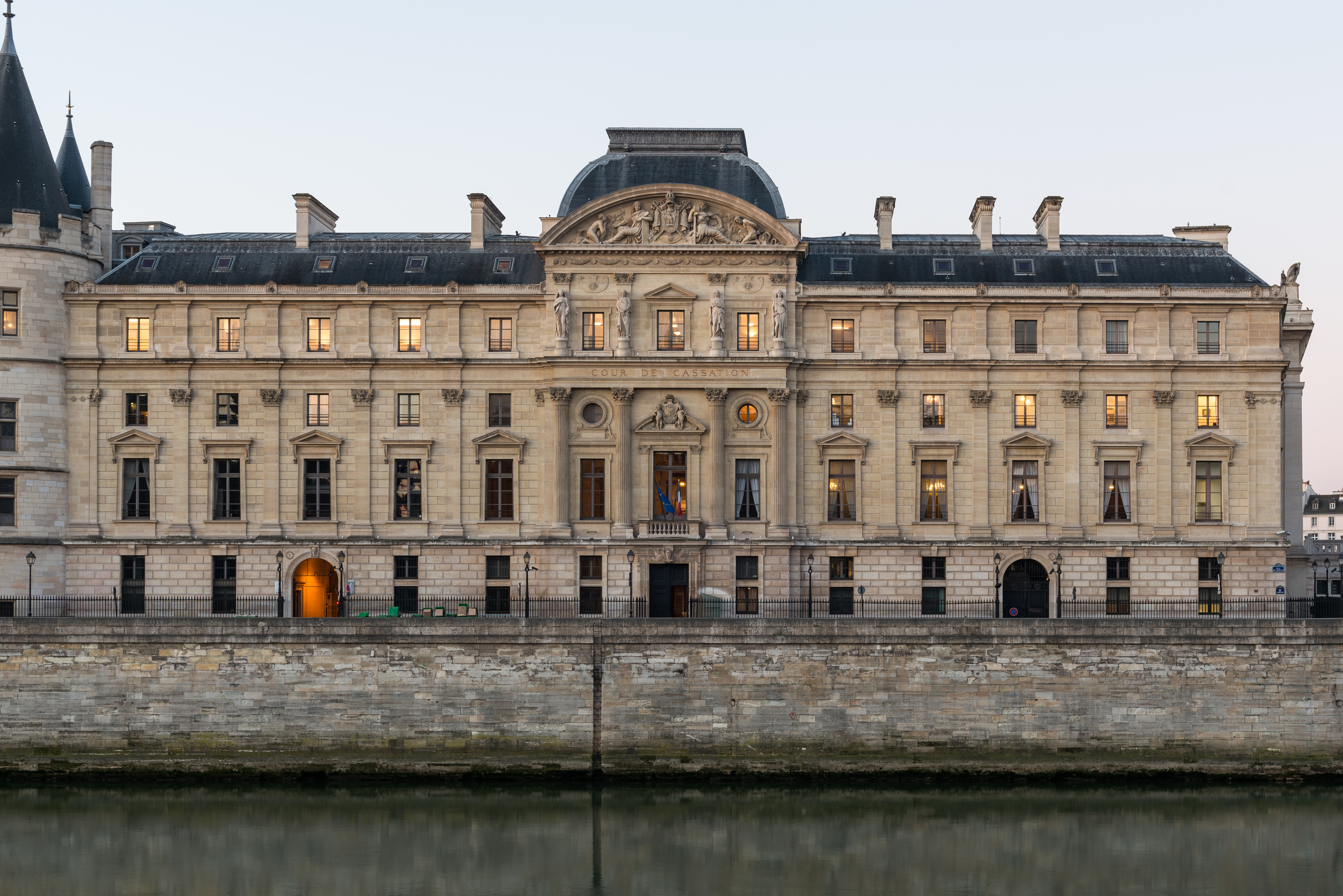
South front of the Cour de Cassation, facing the Seine

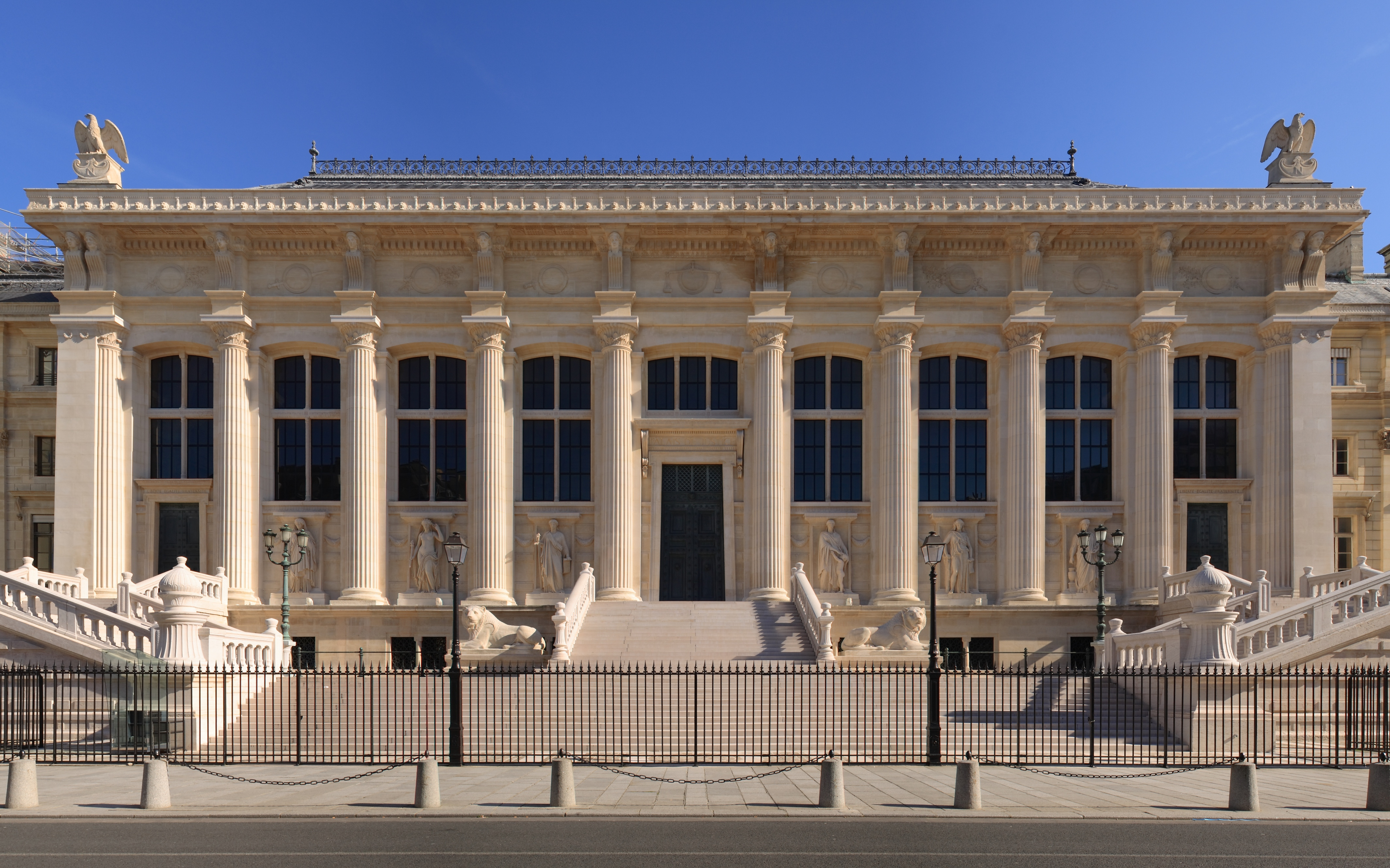
West front of the Palace of Justice

Some historic parts of the Palace were opened to the public in 1914, and in 1934 the prison of the Conciergerie was definitely closed. The lower portion of the Conciergerie became an historical heritage site, while the upper levels continued to be occupied by judicial offices.

The formal entrance to the Palais de Justice is through the Cour de Mai, or "May Courtyard". The lace-ike gilded iron gateway was part of the 19th century reconstruction. Inside, most of the space is occupied by the courtrooms, legal offices, and support functions, including a large law library. Together these occupy about 4500 square meters of the building. Each day the Palais receives about thirteen thousand persons.

The Cour de Cassation is one of the four courts of last resort in France. It has jurisdiction over all civil and criminal matters triable in the judicial system, and is the supreme court of appeal in these cases. It has jurisdiction to review the law, and to certify questions of law, to determine miscarriages of justice.

Though the old Conciergerie prison was closed, the Palace still has three detention facilities. The "Depot", under the control of the Paris Police Prefecture, for those prisoners in "Garde à vue", who most report regularly to the police. About eighty such individuals come to the Depot each day. The second is the "Souricière", a holding area for prisoners before they are taken to a hearing before a judge. This part of the building, under the control of the prison administration, has about seventy-five cells. Finally there is the center for administrative detention, for detaining persons with an irregular legal status.

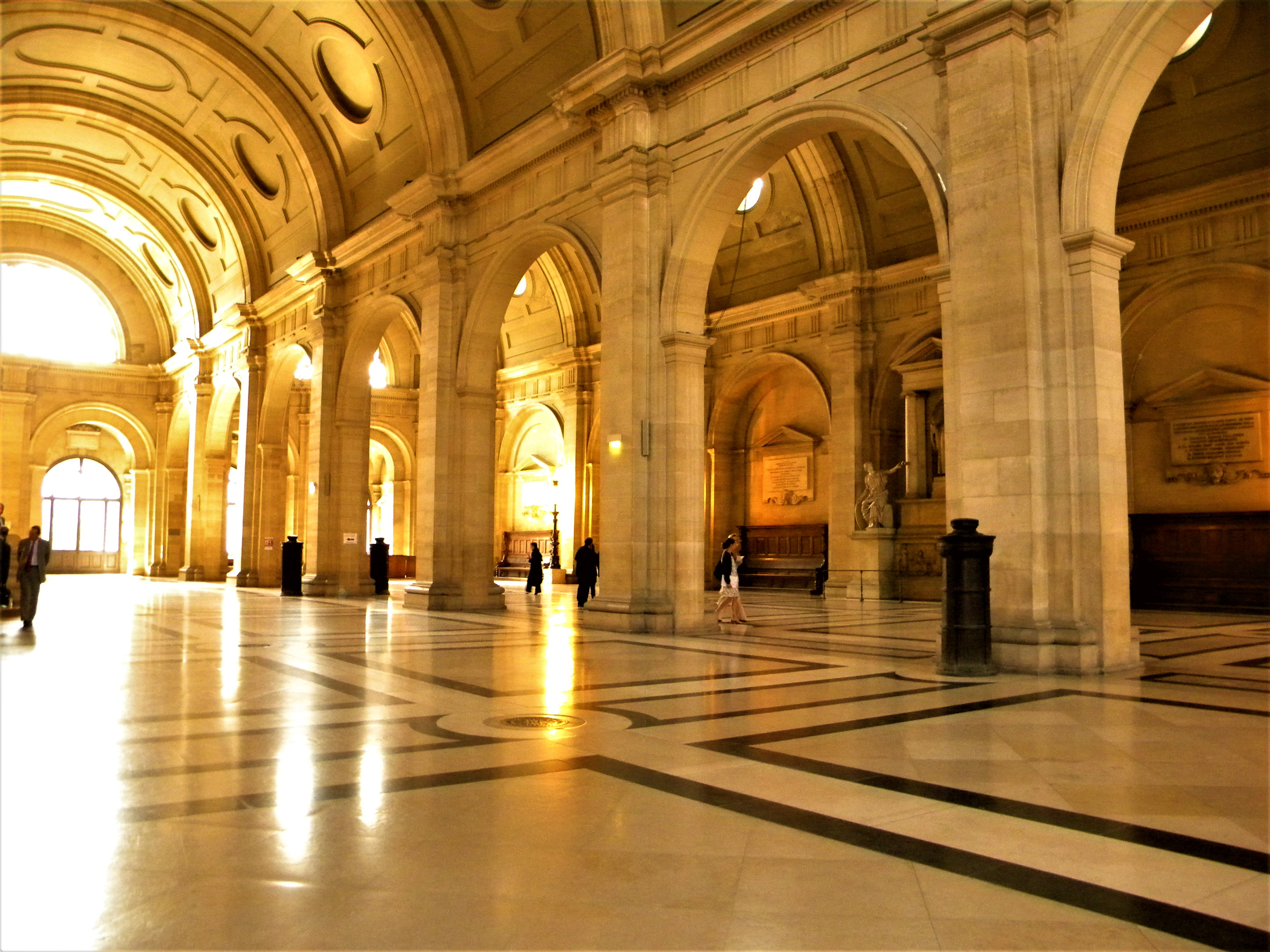
Hall of the "Pas Perdus" leading to courtrooms

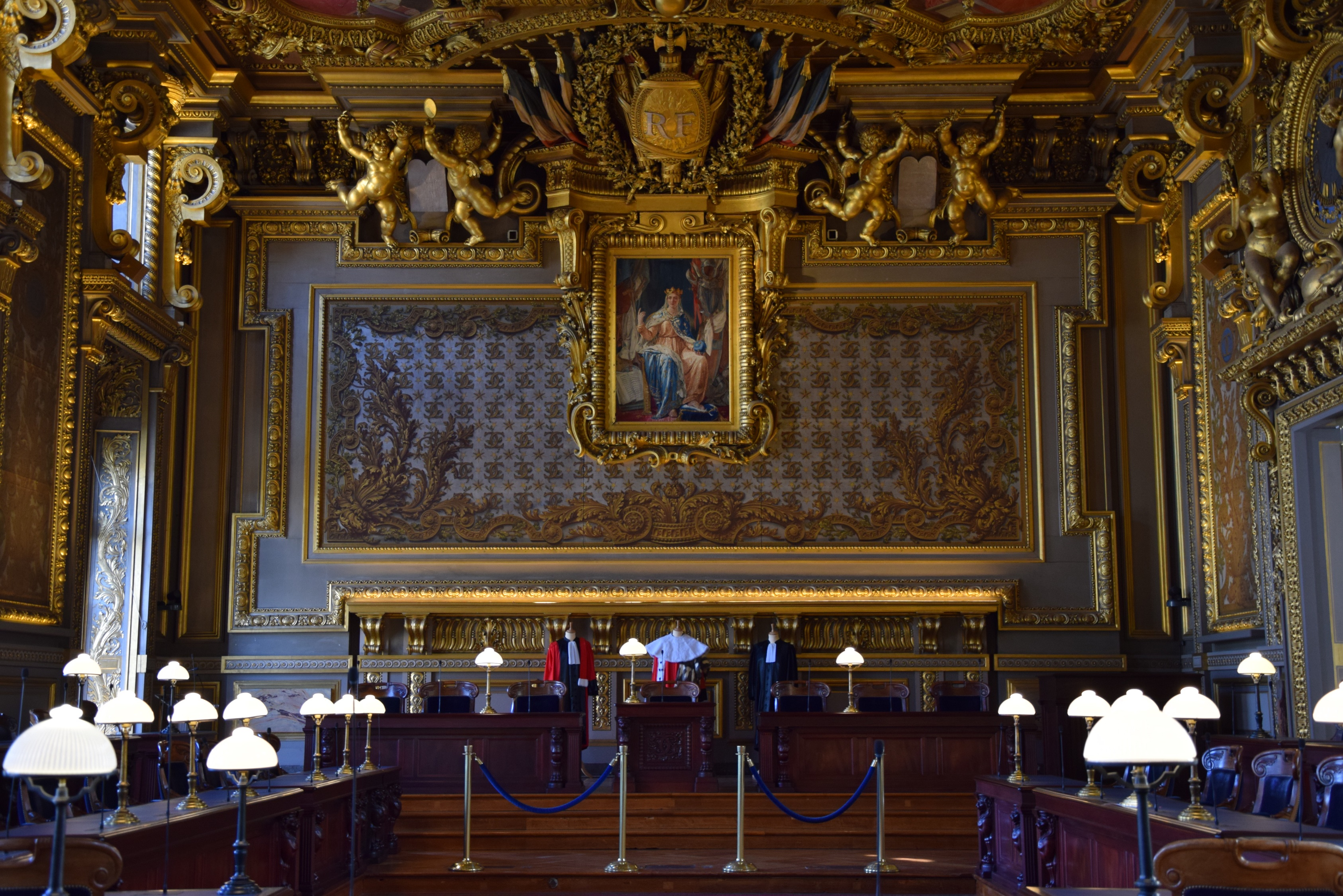
First Chamber of the civil Cour de Cassation

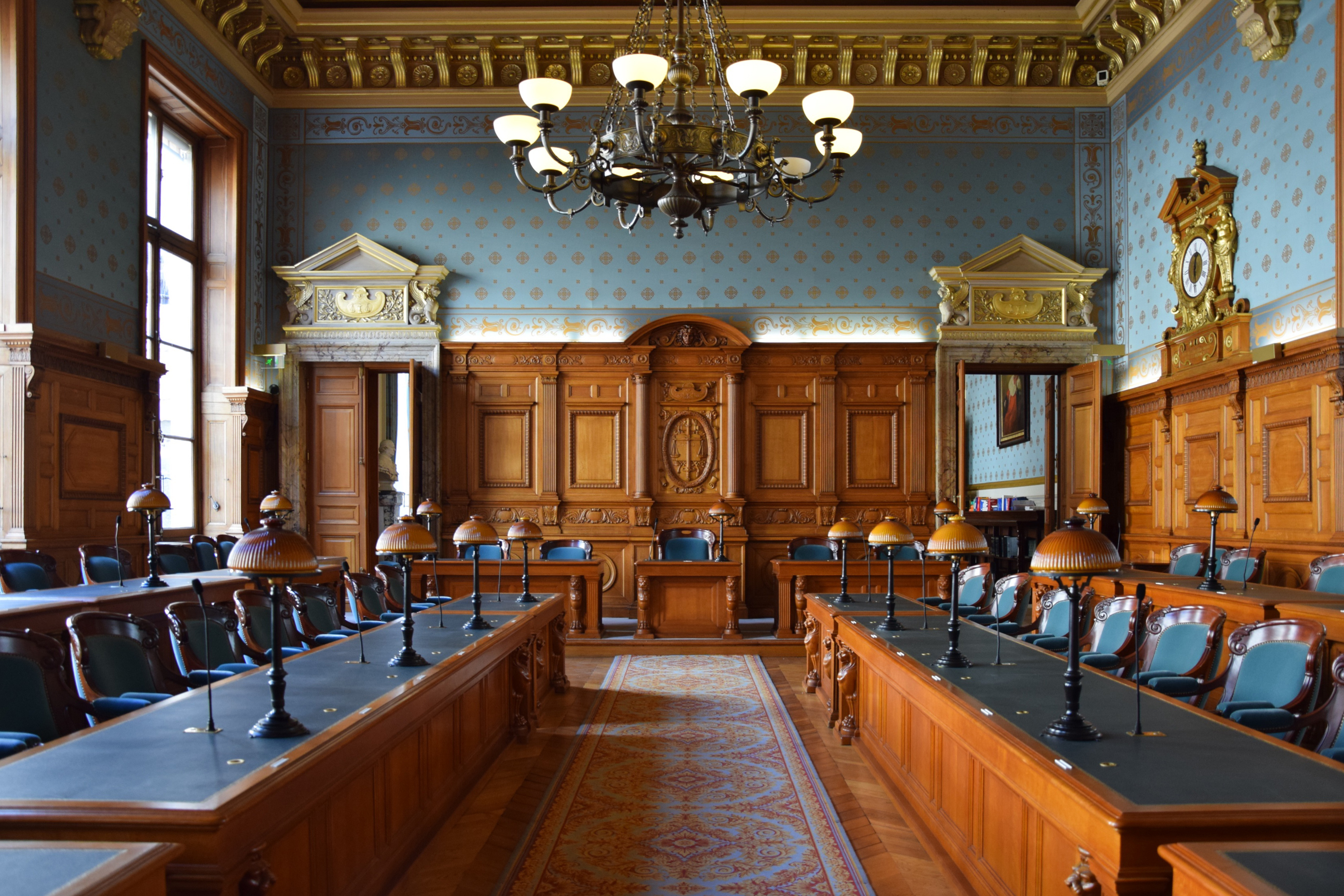
Courtroom in the Cour de Cassation

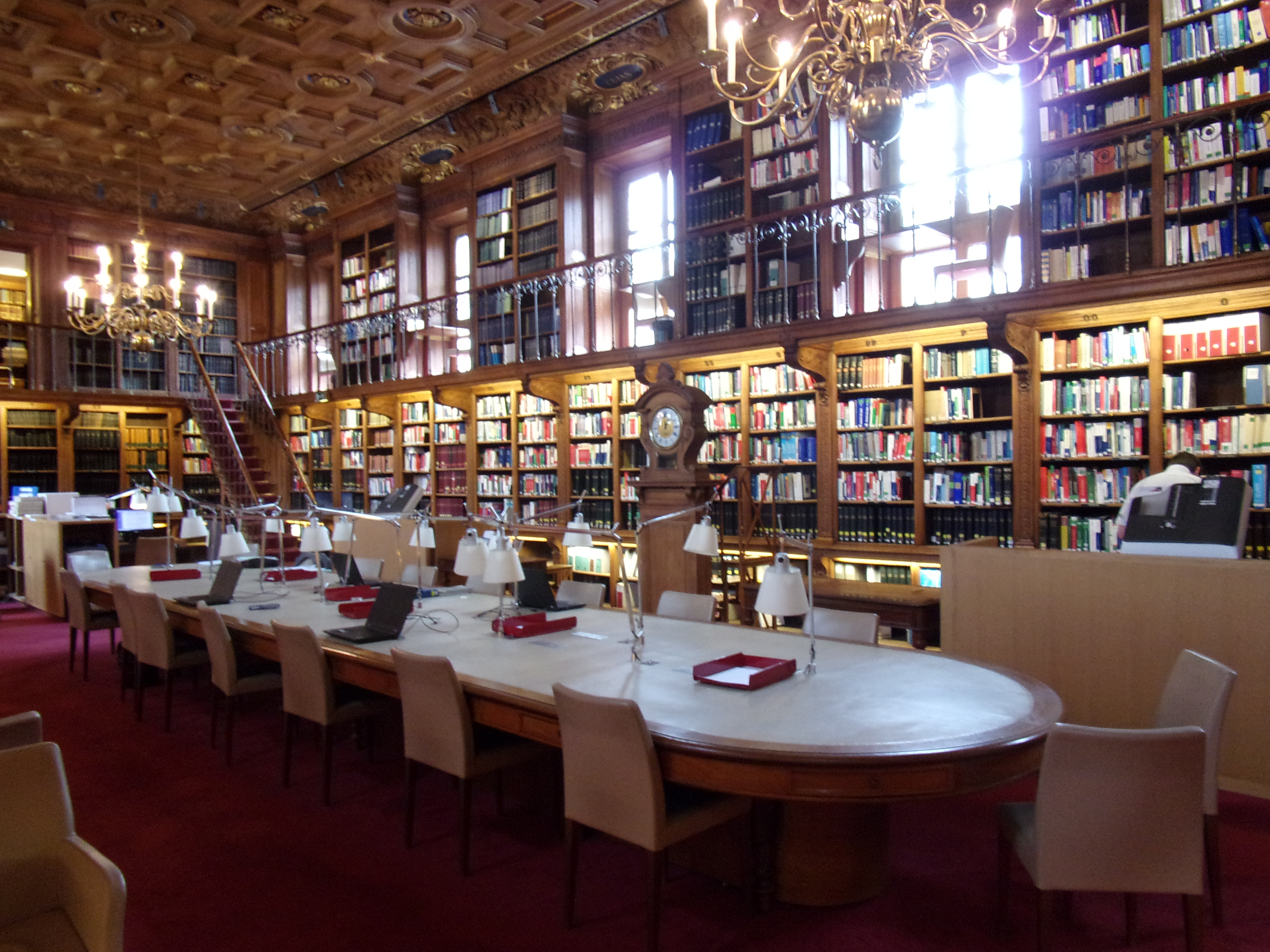
Library of the Cour de Cassation

== See also ==
- Palais de la Cité
- Court of Cassation (France)
- Court of Appeal (France)
- Conciergerie

== Bibliography ==
- Ayers, Andrew (2004). The Architecture of Paris. Stuttgart; London: Edition Axel Menges. ISBN 978-3-930698-96-7.
- Delon, Monique (2000). La Conciergerie - Palais de la Cité (in French). Paris: Editions du Patrimoine- Centre des monuments nationaux. ISBN 978-2-85822-298-8.
- Fierro, Alfred (1996). Histoire et dictionnaire de Paris (in French). Robert Laffont. ISBN 2-221--07862-4.
- de Parseval, Béatrice; Mazeau, Guillaume (2019). The Conciergerie - Palais de la Cité (in English). Paris: Editions du Patrimoine- Centre des monuments nationaux. ISBN 978-2-7577-0667-1.
