= Jean-Antoine Alavoine =

French architect (1778–1834)

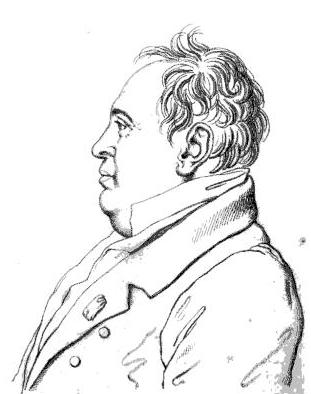
Drawing of Alavoine by Eustache-Hyacinthe Langlois

Jean-Antoine Alavoine (4 January 1778 – 15 November 1834) was a French architect best known for his column in the Place de la Bastille, Paris (1831–1840), the July Column to memorialize those fallen in the Revolution of 1830. The column, consciously larger-scaled than the column in the Place Vendôme, has a capital freely based on the Corinthian order, with exaggerated corner volutes flanking putti holding swags, a complicated and somewhat incoherent design that found no imitators.

However, in 1813 working with another architect, Bridan, Alavoine had designed to Napoleon's orders, under the direction of Ambroise Tardieu, a colossal elephant fountain, the Elephant of the Bastille. This monument was intended for the same Place, to be constructed with a cast-bronze skin over a framework. The statue, in a circular pool, complete with a bronze mahout on its shoulders, would contain a staircase by means of which visitors could admire the view from its howdah. The monument was actually erected, but in staff, a moderately weather-resistant plaster, which lasted until 1846 before it was torn down, to great local relief.

Alavoine's hothouse for the botanical garden of M. Boursault, at Yerres, near Brunoy, was illustrated in Jean-Charles Krafft, Recueil d'architecture civile : contenant les plans, coupes et élévations des châteaux, maisons de campagne, et habitations rurales, jardins anglais, temples, chaumières, kiosques, ponts, etc., situés, aux environs de Paris... (Paris 1812) Plate XLVII, as well as a bridge for M. Hypolitte, in the park at Cassan (Plate XLII).

In the early stages of the Gothic Revival in France, he produced a design for the spire of Rouen Cathedral in 1823, based upon the spire of Salisbury Cathedral (Glaser).
