= July Column =

Victory column in Paris

Coordinates: 48°51′11″N 2°22′09″E

- Colonne de Juillet
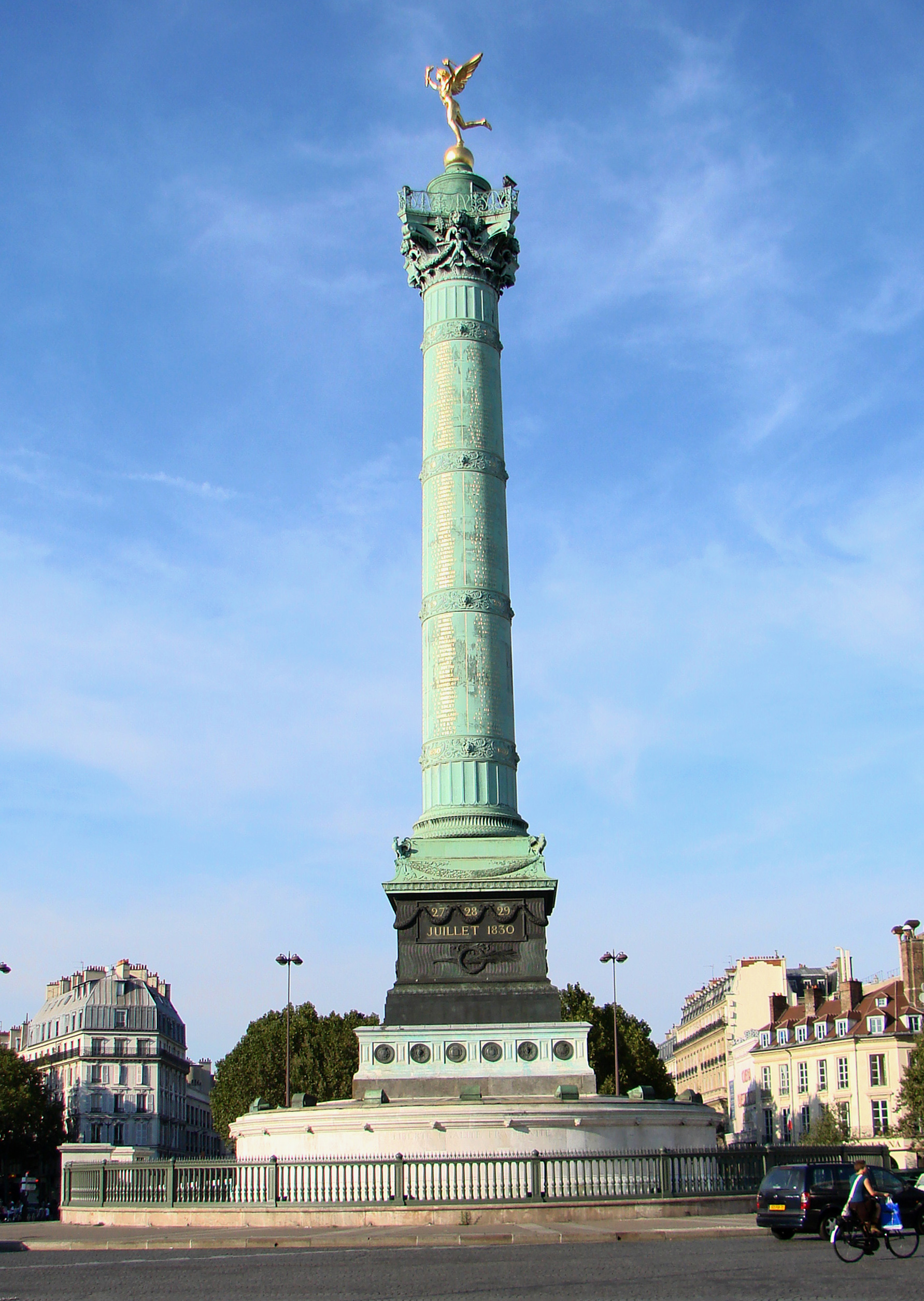
- Jean-Antoine Alavoine's Colonne de Juillet (1835–1840) in 2007
- Interactive map of July Column
- Location: Place de la Bastille, Paris, France
- Designer: Jean-Antoine Alavoine, Joseph-Louis Duc
- Type: Victory column
- Material: Bronze column on white marble base
- Height: 47m
- Weight: 163,000lbs
- Visitors: 2,400 (in 2022)
- Beginning date: 1835
- Completion date: 1840
- Dedicated date: 28 July 1840
- Dedicated to: Commemoration of the July Revolution

The July Column (French: Colonne de Juillet, [kɔlɔn d(ə) ʒɥijɛ]) is a monumental column in Paris commemorating the Revolution of 1830. It stands in the center of the Place de la Bastille and celebrates the Trois Glorieuses — the 'three glorious' days of 27–29 July 1830 that saw the fall of Charles X, King of France, and the commencement of the July Monarchy of Louis-Philippe, King of the French. It was built between 1835 and 1840.

== History ==
A first project for one commemorative column, one that would commemorate the Fall of the Bastille, had been envisaged in 1792, and a foundation stone was laid, 14 July 1792; but the project never got further than that. The circular basin in which its socle stands was realised during the Empire as part of the Elephant of the Bastille, a fountain with an elephant in its centre. The elephant was completed to designs by Percier and Fontaine in semi-permanent stucco, but the permanent bronze sculpture was never commissioned due to pinched finances in the latter days of the Empire. Its low base has been retained to support the socle of the column.

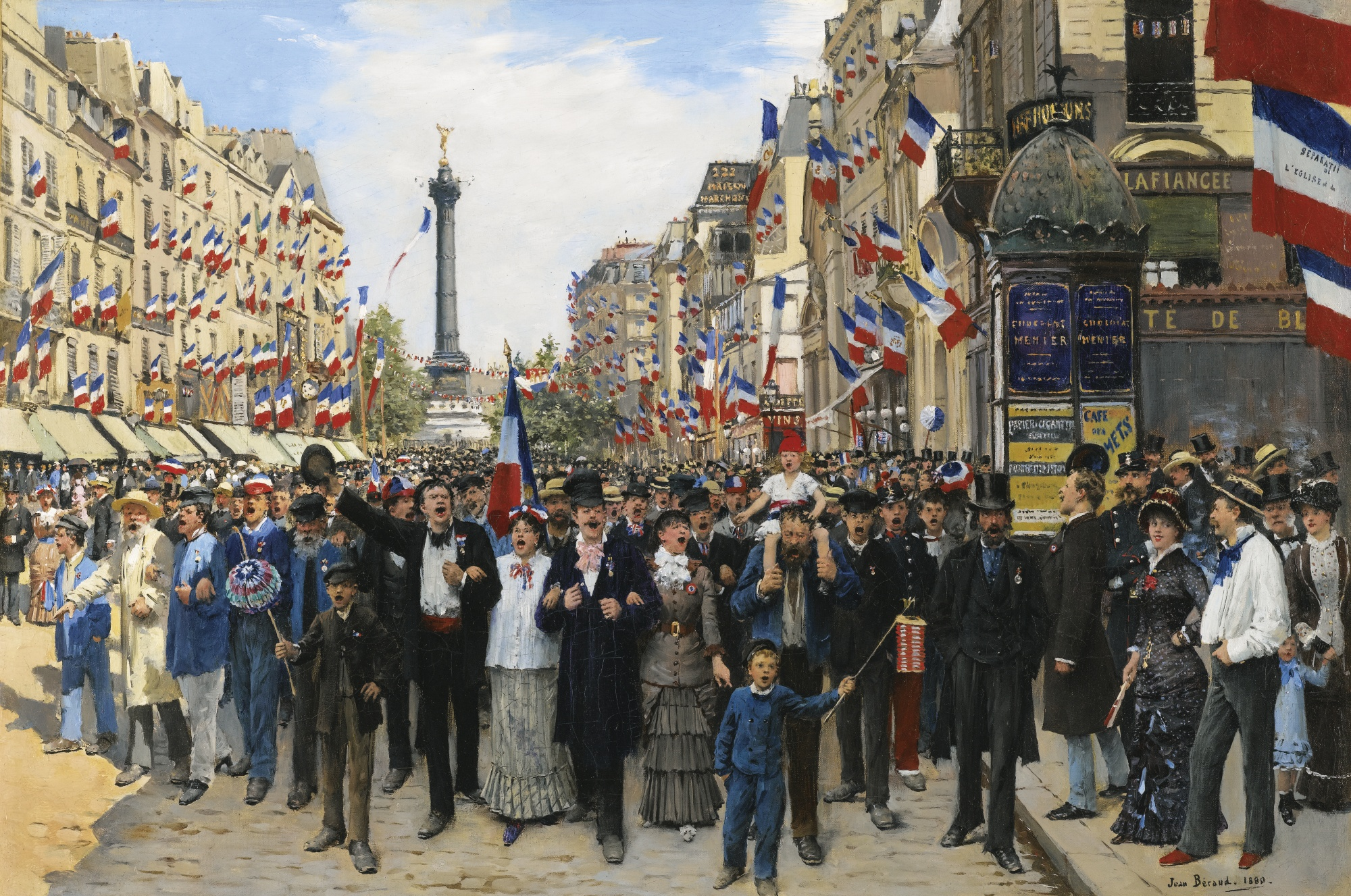
Bastille Day 1880 in Paris by Jean Béraud, with the July Column in the background.

The monument, in an elaboration of a Corinthian column, was designed by the architect Jean-Antoine Alavoine, following a commission from Louis-Philippe: the Place de la Bastille was officially selected as the site on 9 March 1831, and the Citizen-King placed a first stone on 28 July 1831, the anniversary of the revolution that brought him to power; a hymn with words by Victor Hugo and music by Ferdinand Hérold was sung at the Panthéon on the occasion. The Colonne de Juillet was constructed by Alavoine's partner in the project, Joseph-Louis Duc. It was inaugurated 28 July 1840. Music composed for the occasion was Hector Berlioz's Grande Symphonie funèbre et triomphale, which was performed in the open air under the direction of Berlioz himself, leading the procession of musicians which ended at the Place de la Bastille. Jean-Pierre Montagny issued commemorative medals on the occasion.

In the foundation, a columbarium was arranged to receive the remains of 615 victims of the July Revolution. A further 200 victims of the Revolution of 1848 were later interred in the space; the throne of Louis-Philippe was symbolically burned in the square, in July 1848.

== Description ==
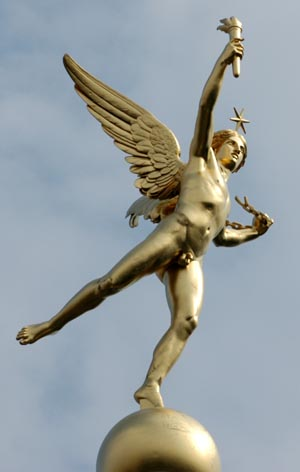
Augustin Dumont's Génie de la Liberté

The Colonne de Juillet is composed of twenty-one cast bronze drums, weighing over 74 tonnes (163,000 lb); it is 47 metres (154 ft) high, containing an interior spiral staircase, and rests on a base of white marble ornamented with bronze bas-reliefs, of which the lion by Antoine-Louis Barye is the most noted. The roosters at the corners are also by Barye. The column is engraved in gold with the names of those who died during the July 1830 revolution. Over the Corinthian capital is a gallery 4.9 metres (16 ft) wide, surmounted with a gilded globe, on which stands a colossal gilded figure, Augustin's Génie de la Liberté (the "Spirit of Freedom"). Perched on one foot in the manner of Giambologna's Mercury, the star-crowned nude brandishes the torch of civilisation and the remains of his broken chains. Formerly, the figure also appeared on French ten-franc coins. Gustave Flaubert, in Sentimental Education, compares the statue to a large golden star shining in the east.

== See also ==
- Berlin Victory Column
- Congress Column
- Nelson's Column
- Washington Monument (Baltimore)
