= Jean-Pierre Montagny =

Jean-Pierre Montagny (31 July 1789 – 1862) was a French medallist and coiner, one of the most notable such figures in the 19th-century Monnaie de Paris.

== Early life and education; career ==
He was born at Saint-Étienne and studied under his father, Clément Montagny, and under the sculptor Pierre Cartellier.

He produced several coins and medals in bronze, copper and tin on the main events in French history from 1800 to 1850 –including the inauguration of the July Column in 1840 – with his most-intense production being designs relating to the French Revolution of 1848.

== Death ==
He died in Belleville.
