= Place de la Bastille =

Square in Paris, France

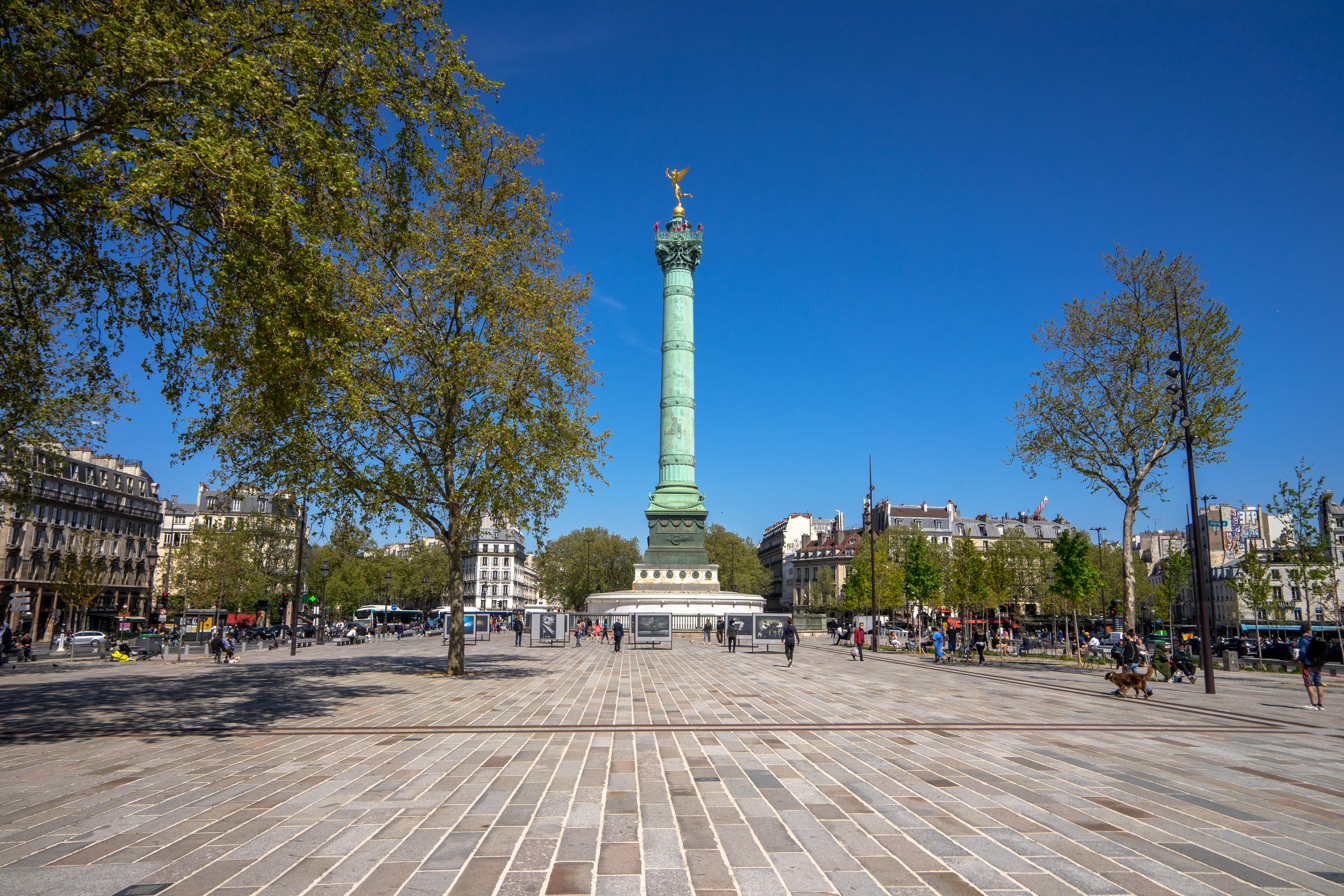
- The July Column, with the new pedestrian area at the south side following removal of the large road between 2019 and 2021

- Location within Paris
- Length: 215 m (705 ft)
- Width: 150 m (490 ft) average
- Arrondissement: 4th, 11th, 12th
- Quarter: Arsenal, Roquette, Quinze-Vingts
- Nearest metro station: Bastille
- Coordinates: 48°51′11″N 2°22′9″E

Construction
- Completed: 27 June 1792

The Place de la Bastille (French pronunciation: [plas d(ə) la bastij]) is a square in Paris where the Bastille Prison once stood, until the storming of the Bastille and its subsequent physical destruction between 14 July 1789 and 14 July 1790 during the French Revolution. No vestige of the prison remains, although its footprint is marked by golden discs.

The square straddles three arrondissements of Paris, namely the 4th, 11th and 12th. The square and its surrounding areas are normally called simply Bastille. The July Column (Colonne de Juillet) which commemorates the events of the July Revolution (1830) stands at the center of the square. Other notable features include the Bastille Opera, the Bastille metro station and a section of the Canal Saint Martin. Prior to 1984, the former Bastille railway station stood where the opera house now stands.

The square is home to concerts and similar events. The north-eastern area of Bastille is busy at night with its many cafés, bars, night clubs, and concert halls. As a consequence of its historical significance, the square is often the site or point of departure of political demonstrations.

== History ==
=== Early history of the Bastille ===
The Bastille was built between 1370 and 1383 during the reign of Charles V as part of the defenses of Paris; the structure was converted into a state prison in the 17th century by Richelieu, Louis XIII's chief minister. At that time, it primarily housed political prisoners, but also religious prisoners, "seditious" writers, and young rakes held at the request of their families. It began to acquire a poor reputation when it became the main prison for those taken under lettres de cachet issued by the King of France.

By the late 18th century, the building was made up of eight close-packed towers, around 24 m (80 ft) high, surrounding two courtyards and the armoury. The prisoners were held within the 5–7 story towers, each having a room around 4.6 m (15 ft) across and containing various articles of furniture. The infamous cachots (dungeons), the oozing, vermin-infested subterranean cells were no longer in use, since the respective reigns of Louis XV and Louis XVI, who both worked on reforming the penal system in France. The governor of the prison was given a daily allowance per prisoner, the amount depending on their status—from nineteen livres per diem for scientists and academics down to three for commoners. Although its prisoners' conditions were better than in many other prisons in France, including the dreaded Bicêtre in Paris, popular literary accounts focused on the Bastille as a place of horror and oppression and a symbol of autocratic cruelty.

=== Storming of the Bastille ===
Storming of the Bastille (1789), by Jean-Pierre-Louis-Laurent Houel

The confrontation between the commoners and the Ancien Régime ultimately led to the people of Paris storming the Bastille on 14 July 1789, following several days of disturbances. At this point, the prison was nearly empty, with only seven inmates: four counterfeiters, two madmen, and a young aristocrat who had displeased his father. The regular garrison consisted of about 80 'invalides' (veteran soldiers no longer capable of service in the field) under Governor Bernard-René de Launay. They had however been reinforced by a detachment of 32 grenadiers from one of the Swiss mercenary regiments summoned to Paris by the Monarchy shortly before 14 July.

A crowd of around 600 people gathered outside around mid-morning, calling for the surrender of the prison, the removal of the guns and the release of the arms and gunpowder. Two people chosen to represent those gathered were invited into the fortress and slow negotiations began.

In the early afternoon, the crowd broke into the undefended outer courtyard and the chains on the drawbridge to the inner courtyard were cut. A spasmodic exchange of gunfire began; in mid-afternoon the crowd was reinforced by mutinous Gardes Françaises of the Royal Army and two cannons. De Launay ordered a ceasefire; despite his surrender demands being refused, he capitulated and the victors swept in to liberate the fortress at around 5:30.

=== Later history ===
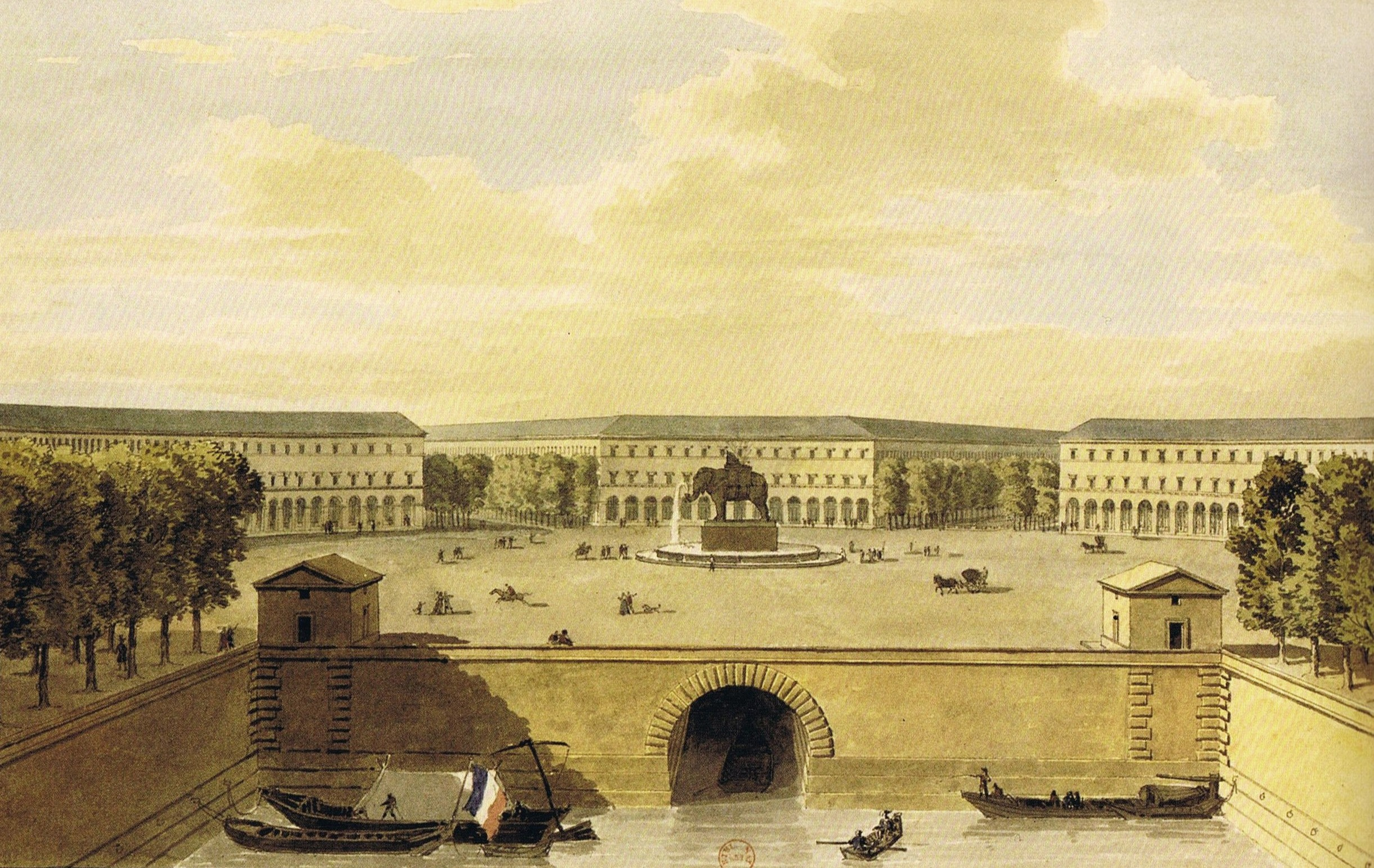
Initial project for the Place de la Bastille's redevelopment, with an elephant sculpture to be built in its center

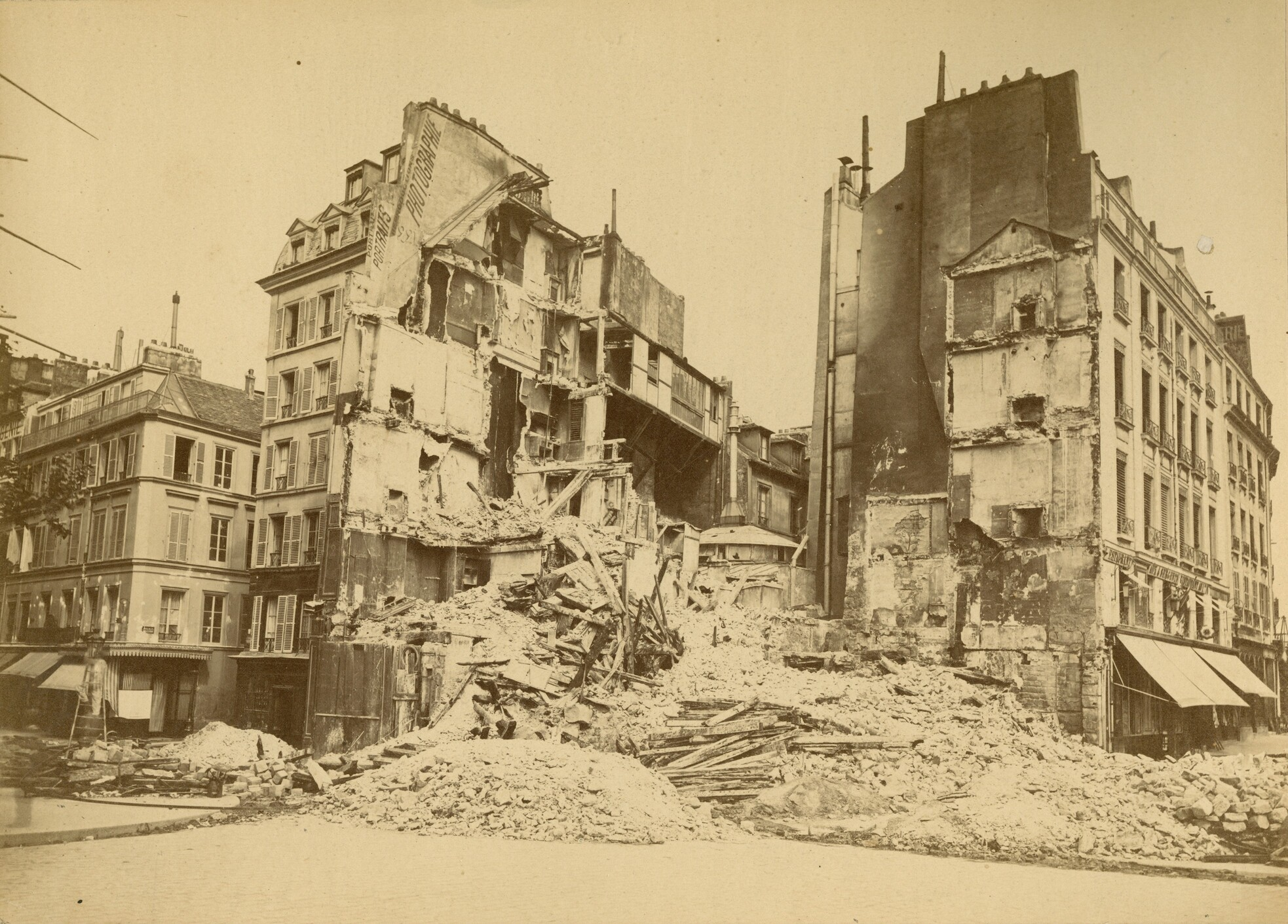
Place de la Bastille amidst Commune destruction, by Alphonse Liebert, 1871

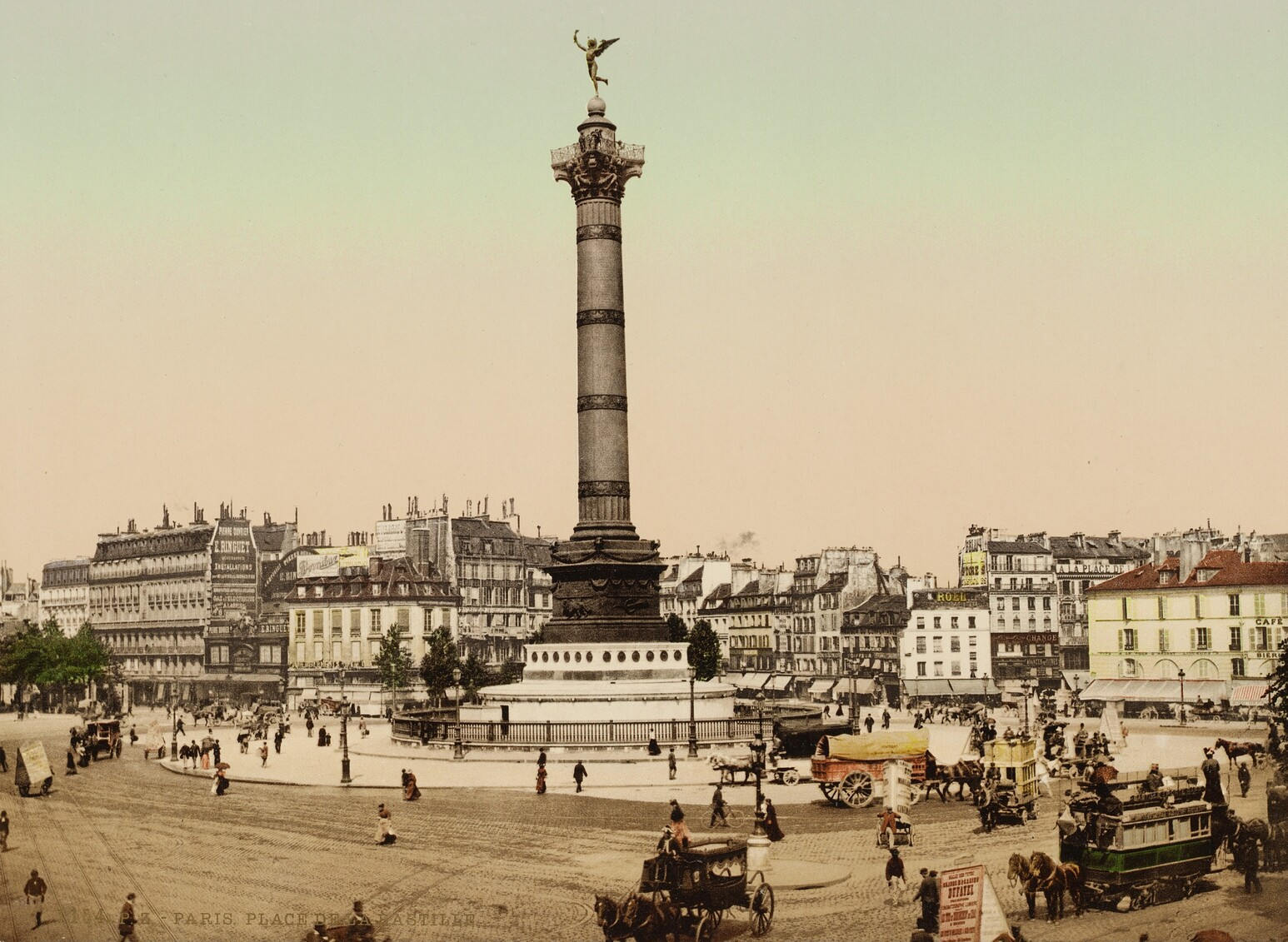
Postcard of the Place de la Bastille, 19th c.

On 16 June 1792, the area occupied by the Bastille was turned into a square celebrating liberty, and a column was erected there. The first stone was laid by Palloy; however, construction never took place, and a fountain was built instead in 1793.

In 1808, as part of several urban improvement projects for Paris, Napoleon planned to have a monument in the shape of an elephant built here, the Elephant of the Bastille. It was designed to be 24 m (78 ft) in height, and to be cast from the bronze of cannons taken from the Spanish. Access to the top was to be achieved by a stairway set in one of the legs. However, only a full-scale plaster model was built. Victor Hugo immortalised the monument in the novel Les Misérables where it is used as a shelter by Gavroche. The monument was demolished in 1846.

In 1833, Louis Philippe I decided to build the July Column as originally planned in 1792. It was inaugurated in 1840.

The area was damaged during the events of the Paris Commune in spring 1871.

== The area today ==
The current Place de la Bastille is located on the former fort's site. In addition to the July Column, it is also home to the Opéra Bastille. The large ditch (fossé) behind the former fort has been transformed into a marina for pleasure boats, the Bassin de l'Arsenal, to the south, which is bordered by the Boulevard de la Bastille. To the north, a covered canal, the Canal Saint-Martin, extends north from the marina beneath the vehicular roundabout that borders the location of the fort, and then continues for about 4.4 kilometers to the Place de la Bataille-de-Stalingrad.

On Thursdays and Sundays, a large, open-air market occupies part of the park to the north of the Place de la Bastille, along the Boulevard Richard-Lenoir. Consumers can find fresh fruit, fish, meat, cheese and bread along with clothing and typical flea market items.

Some undemolished remains of one tower of the fort were discovered during excavation for the Métro rapid transit system in 1899, and were moved to a park (the Square Henri-Galli) a few hundred metres away, where they are displayed today. The original outline of the fort is also marked on the pavement of streets and pathways that pass over its former location, in the form of special paving stones. A café and some other businesses largely occupy the location of the fort, and the Rue Saint-Antoine passes directly over it as it opens onto the roundabout of the Bastille. The nearest Métro station is Bastille, which is served by Line 1, Line 5, and Line 8.

== Gallery ==
New situation after the relayout and the removal of the large road south of the monument (2021)

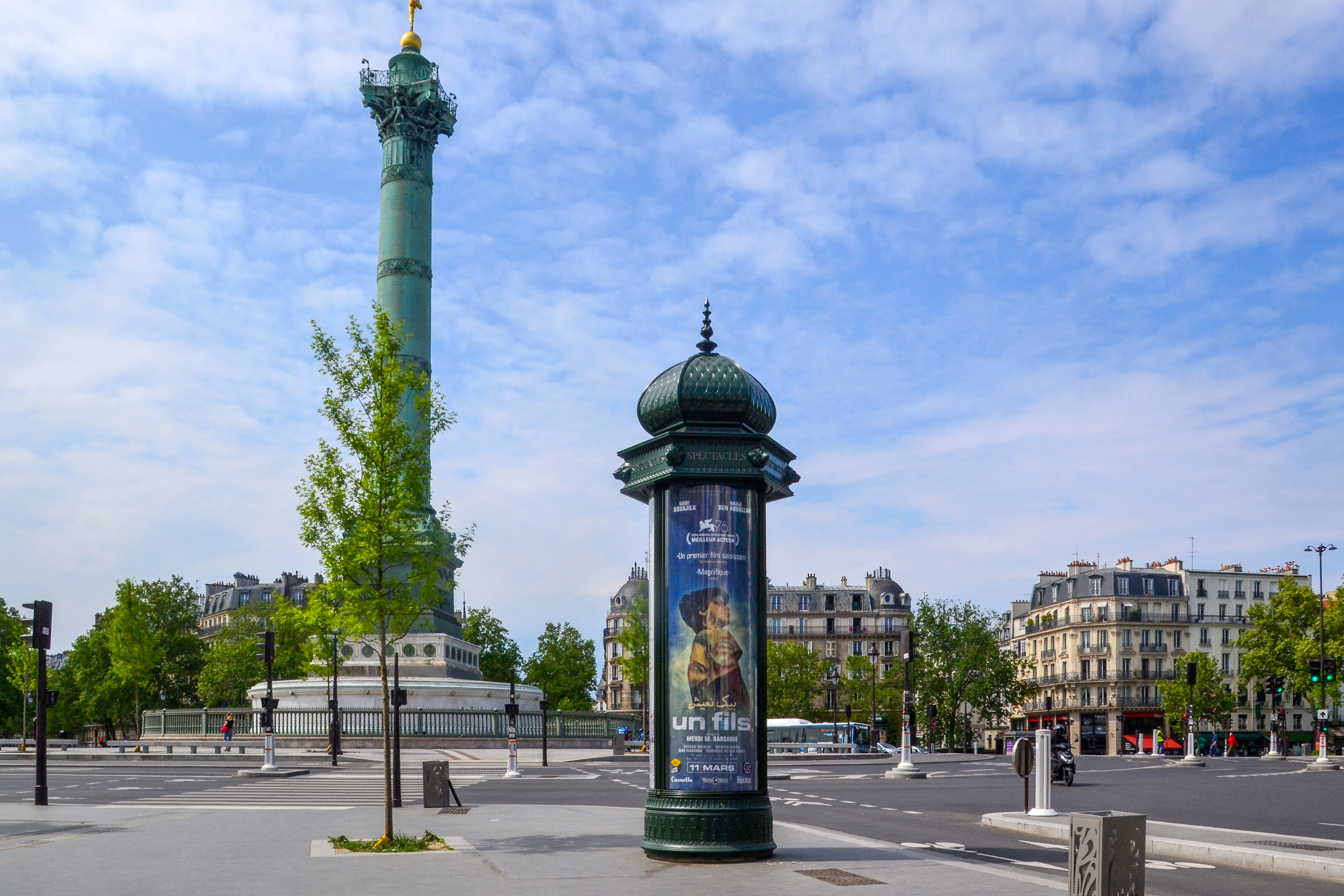
Place de la Bastille in 2020

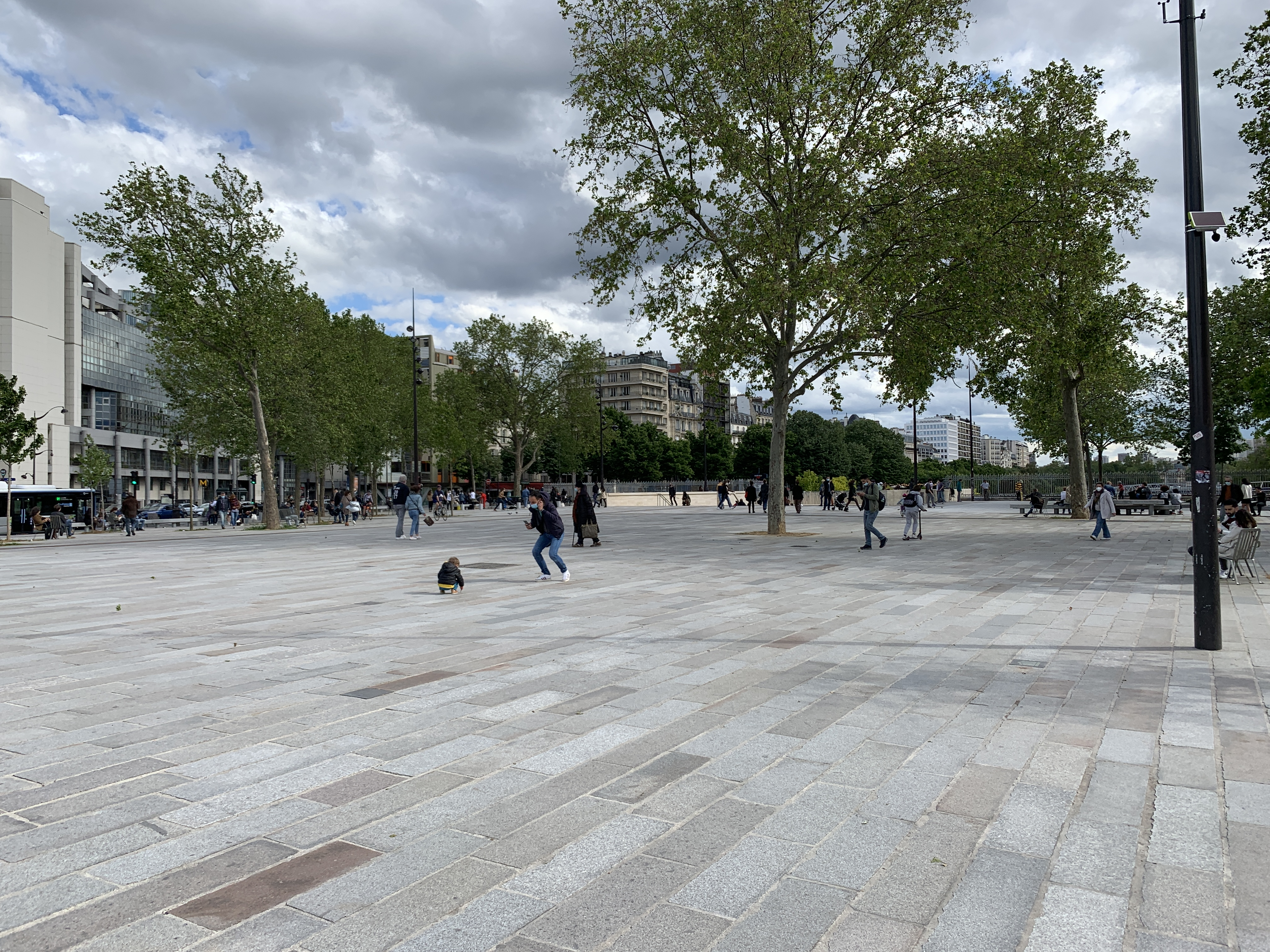
Now with a pedestrian space at the south side of the monument

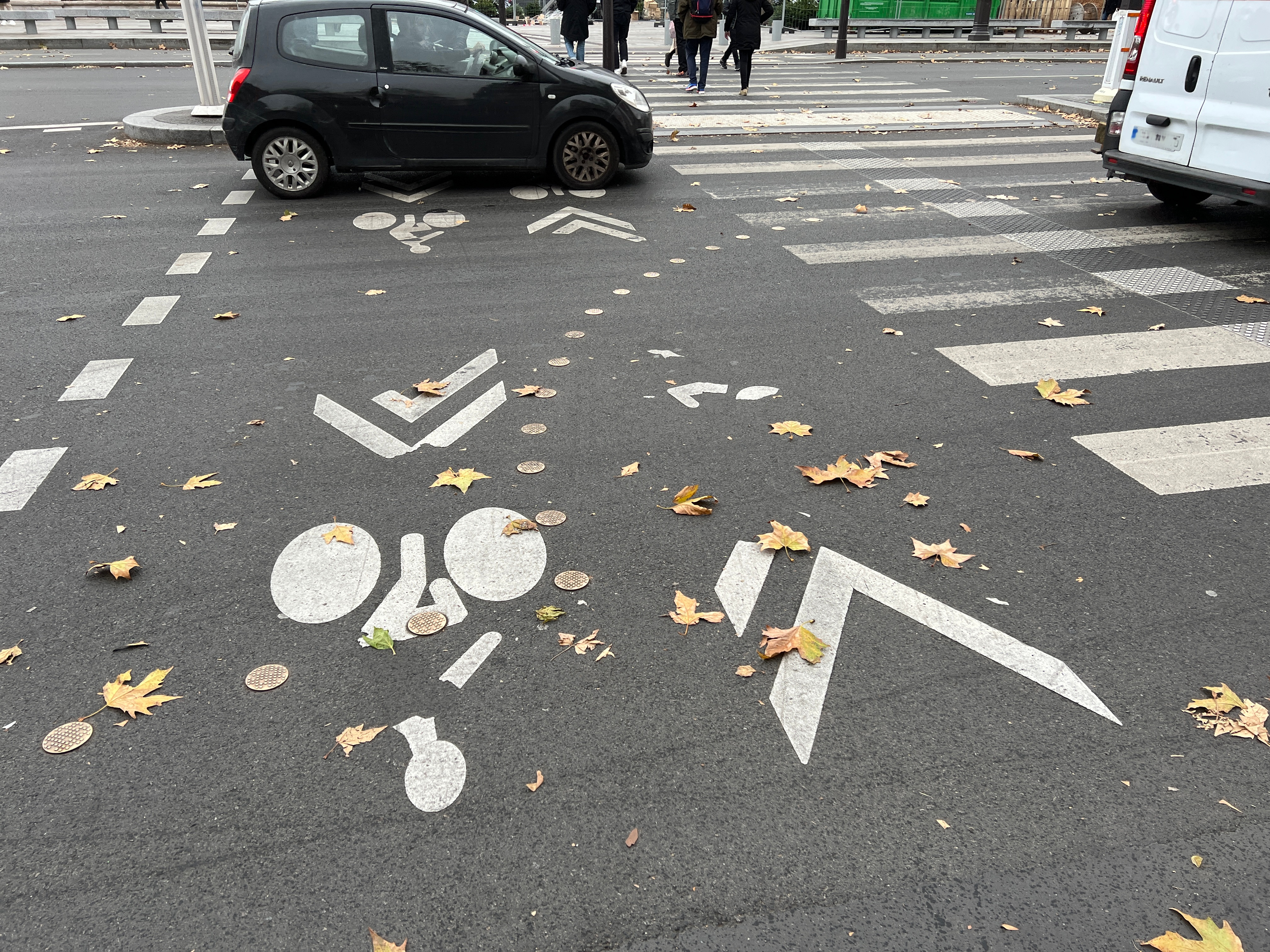
The bronze medallions show the contours of the former Bastille fort

The Opéra Bastille

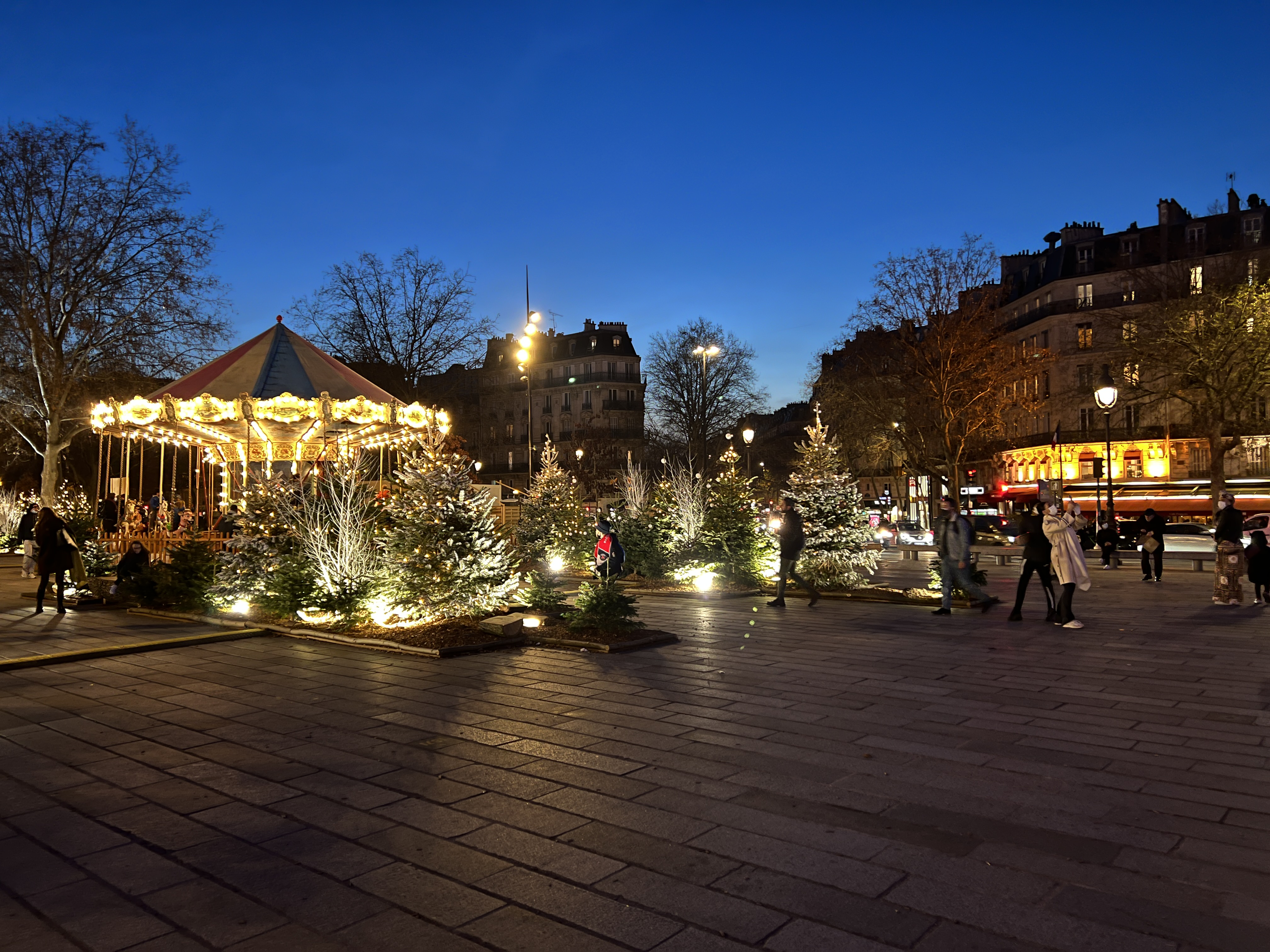
Christmas trees on the square
Old situation with the large road south of the monument (before the relayout of 2019–2021)

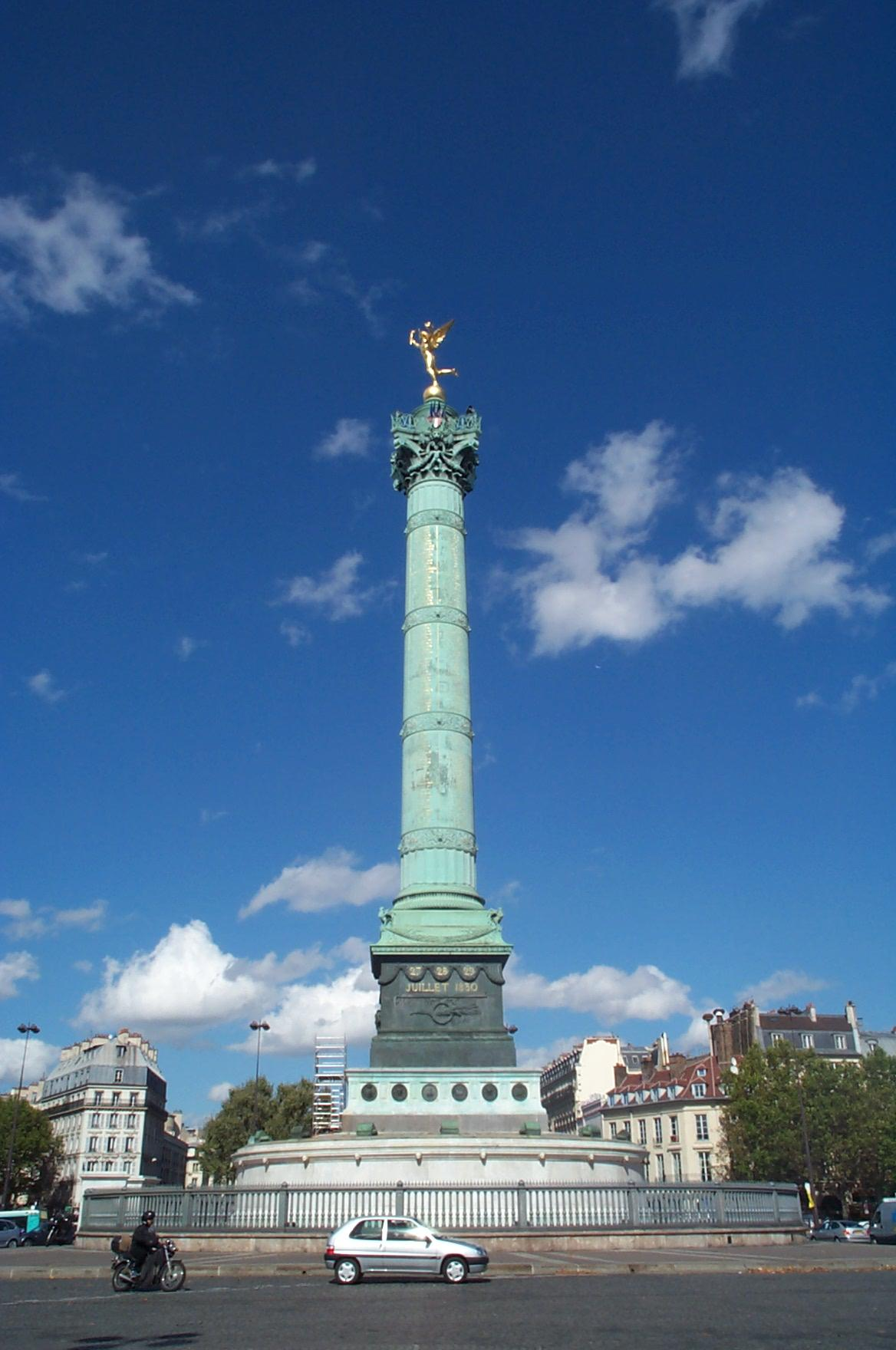

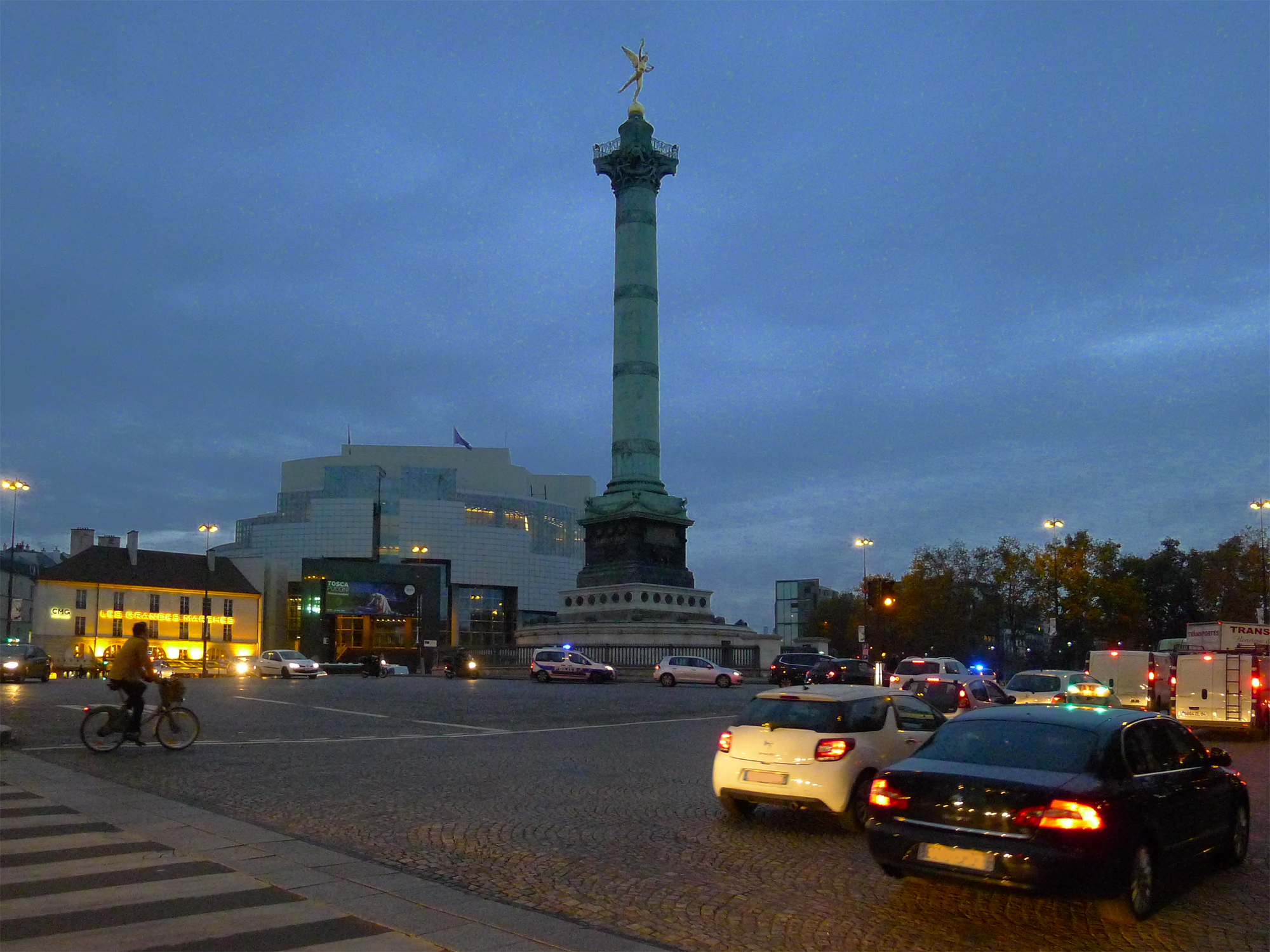

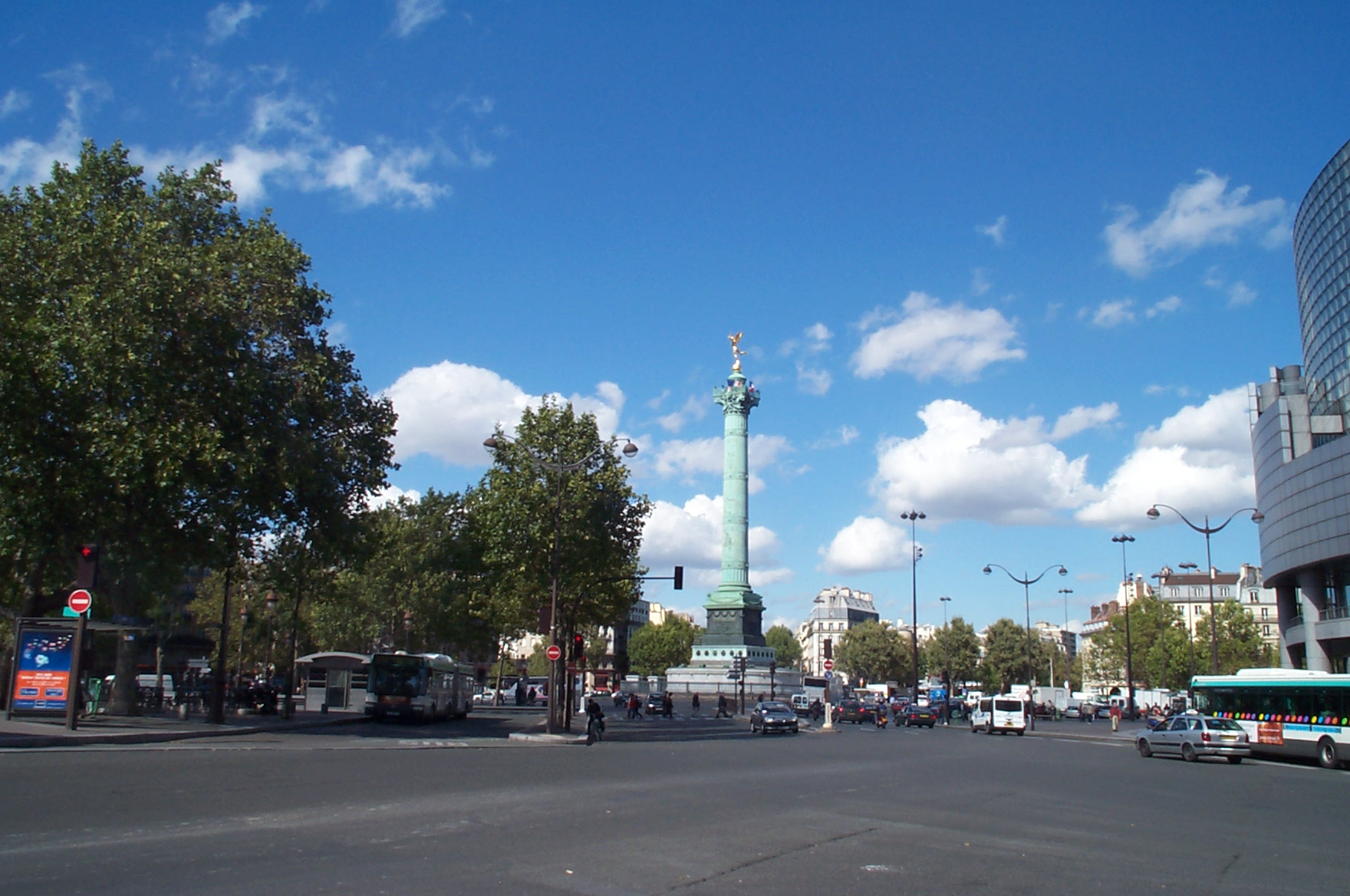

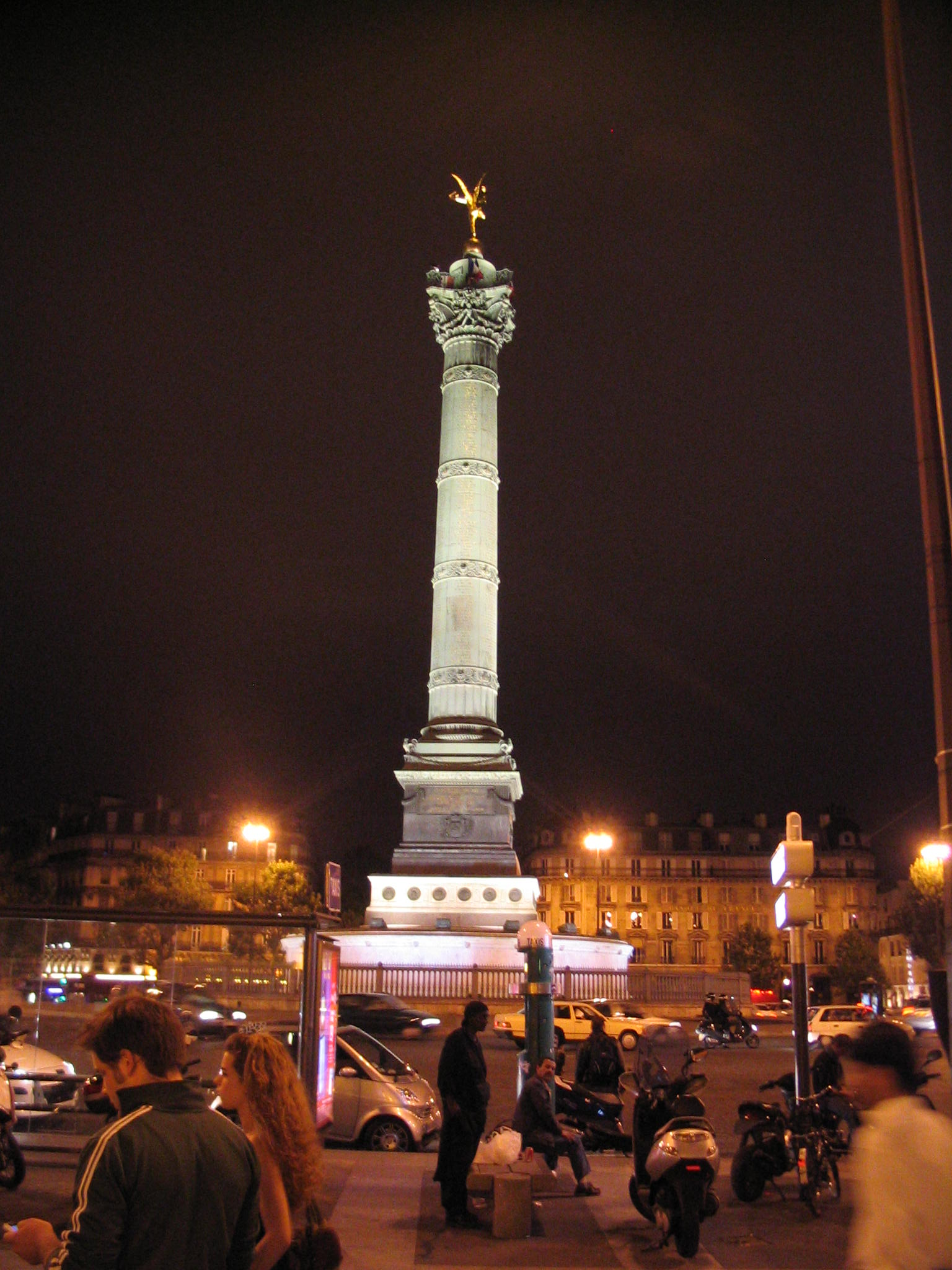

== See also ==
- Bastille
- Bastille Day
