= Jeremy Irons on stage and screen =

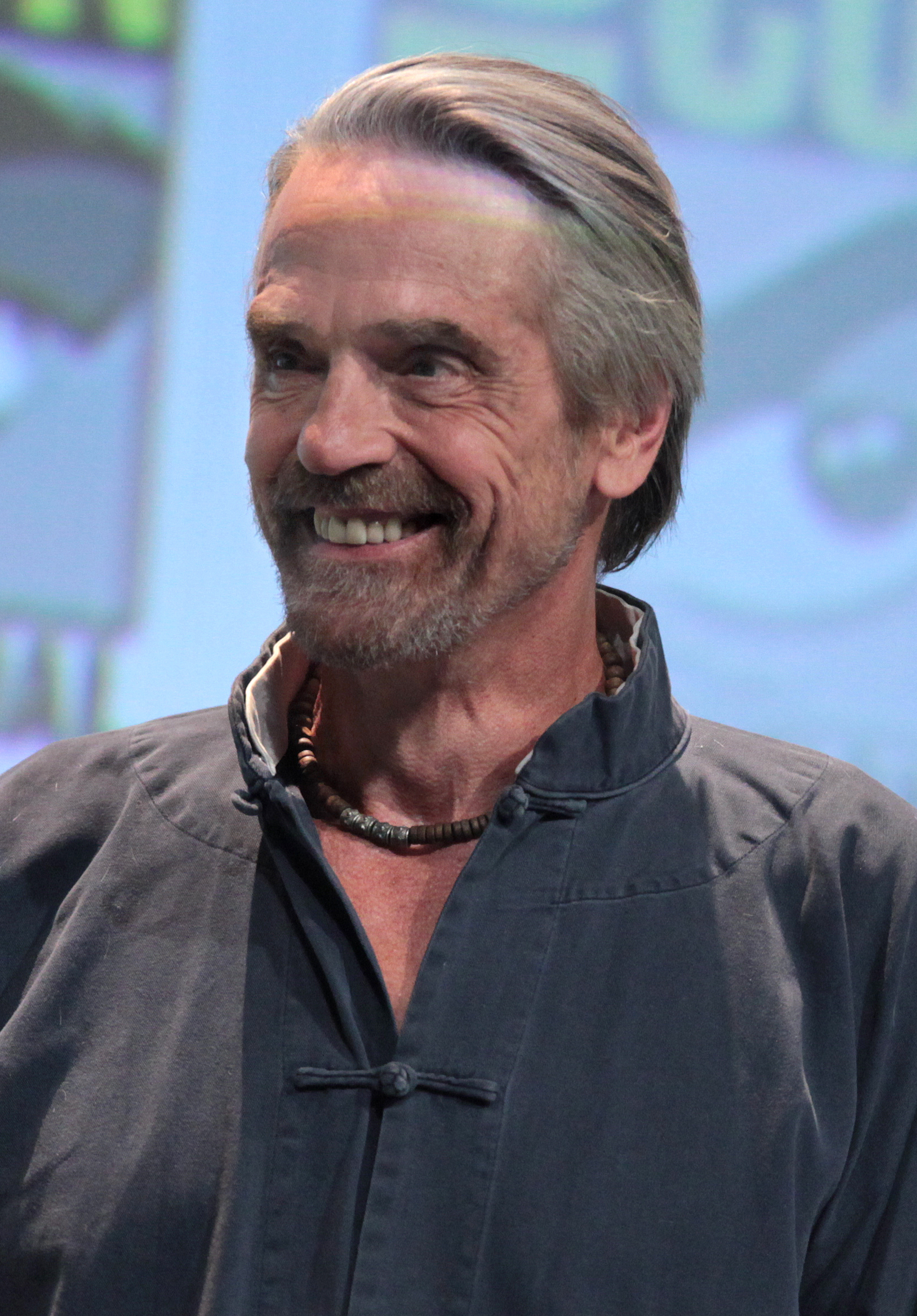
Irons at the 2015 San Diego Comic-Con.

Jeremy Irons is an English actor known for his roles on stage, screen and television.

== Theatre ==
Following his training at the Bristol Old Vic Theatre School, Irons first acted with the school's theatre company:

Year	Production	Role	Venue
1969	The Winter's Tale	Florizel	Bristol Old Vic
1969	Hay Fever	Simon	Bristol Old Vic
1969	What the Butler Saw	Nick	Bristol Old Vic
1969	Major Barbara		Bristol Old Vic
1969	The Servant of Two Masters		Bristol Old Vic
1969	Macbeth		Bristol Old Vic
1969	The Boy Friend		Bristol Old Vic
1970	As You Like It		Bristol Old Vic
1970	Oh, What a Lovely War!		Little Theatre Bristol
1970	The School for Scandal		Little Theatre Bristol
1971–1973	Godspell	John/Judas	Roundhouse and Wyndham's Theatre
1973	The Diary of a Madman	The Madman	Act Inn
1974	Much Ado About Nothing	Don Pedro	Young Vic
1974	The Caretaker	Mick	Young Vic
1975	The Taming of the Shrew	Petruchio	Roundhouse
1976	Wild Oats	Harry Thunder	Aldwych Theatre
1977	Wild Oats	Harry Thunder	Stratford and Piccadilly Theatre
1978	The Rear Column	Jameson	Globe Theatre
1984–1985	The Real Thing	Henry	Plymouth Theatre (Broadway)
1986	The Winter's Tale	Leontes	Royal Shakespeare Theatre
1986	The Rover	Willmore	Swan Theatre and Mermaid Theatre
1986	Richard II	Richard II	Royal Shakespeare Theatre
1987	Richard II	Richard II	Barbican Theatre
1987	My Fair Lady	Professor Henry Higgins	Royal Albert Hall
2003	A Little Night Music	Fredrick Egerman	New York City Opera
2005	Celebration	Russell	Gate Theatre and Albery Theatre
2005	Camelot	King Arthur	Hollywood Bowl
2006	Embers	Henrik	Duke of York's Theatre
2006	Pinter Plays, Poetry & Prose		Teatro Carignano, Turin
2008	Never So Good	Harold Macmillan	National Theatre
2009	Impressionism	Thomas Buckle	Gerald Schoenfeld Theatre, Broadway
2011	Camelot	King Arthur	Shubert Theatre, Broadway
2013	The Mystery Plays	God	Gloucester Cathedral and Worcester Cathedral
2016	Long Day's Journey into Night	James Tyrone	Bristol Old Vic
2018	Long Day's Journey into Night	James Tyrone	Wyndham's Theatre, BAM and Wallis Annenberg Center
2017	Correspondence 1944–1959 Readings from the epistles between Albert Camus and Maria Casares	Albert	Teatro Argentina, Rome
2017	Ashes to Ashes (Special creation for the Europe Theatre Prize)	Devlin	Teatro Argentina, Rome

== Film ==
Year	Title	Role	Notes
1980	Nijinsky	Mikhail Fokine	
1981	The French Lieutenant's Woman	Charles Henry Smithson/Mike	
1982	Moonlighting	Nowak	
1983	Betrayal	Jerry	
1984	The Wild Duck	Harold	
1984	Swann in Love	Charles Swann	
1985	The Statue of Liberty	Himself	Voice; Documentary
1986	The Mission	Father Gabriel	
1988	Dead Ringers	Beverly Mantle / Elliot Mantle	
1989	A Chorus of Disapproval	Guy Jones	
1989	Australia	Edouard Pierson	
1989	Danny, the Champion of the World	William Smith	
1990	Reversal of Fortune	Claus von Bülow	
1991	Beggar's Opera	Prisoner	
1991	Kafka	Franz Kafka	
1992	The Timekeeper	H. G. Wells	Short film
1992	Waterland	Tom Crick	
1992	Damage	Dr. Stephen Fleming	
1993	M. Butterfly	René Gallimard	
1993	The House of the Spirits	Esteban Trueba	
1994	Spaceship Earth	Narrator (3rd edition)	Voice; Documentary short
1994	The Lion King	Scar	Voice
1995	Die Hard with a Vengeance	Simon Gruber	
1996	Stealing Beauty	Alex	
1997	Chinese Box	John	
1997	Lolita	Humbert Humbert	
1998	The Man in the Iron Mask	Aramis	
1999	Faeries	The Shapeshifter	Voice
1999	Poseidon's Fury: Escape from the Lost City	Poseidon	Voice; Short film
2000	Dungeons & Dragons	Profion	
2001	The Fourth Angel	Jack Elgin	
2002	Callas Forever	Larry Kelly	
2002	The Time Machine	The Über-Morlock	
2002	And Now... Ladies and Gentlemen	Valentin Valentin	
2004	Mathilde	Col. De Petris	
2004	The Merchant of Venice	Antonio	
2004	Being Julia	Michael Gosselyn	
2005	Kingdom of Heaven	Tiberias	
2005	Casanova	Pucci	
2006	Inland Empire	Kingsley Stewart	
2006	Eragon	Brom	
2006	Eye of the Leopard	Narrator	Voice; Documentary
2008	Appaloosa	Randall Bragg	
2009	The Pink Panther 2	Alonso Avellaneda	
2011	Margin Call	John Tuld	
2011	The Last Lions	Narrator	Voice; Documentary
2012	The Words	The Old Man	
2012	Trashed	Himself	Documentary; also executive producer
2013	Night Train to Lisbon	Raimund Gregorius	
2013	Beautiful Creatures	Macon Ravenwood	
2015	High-Rise	Anthony Royal	
2015	The Man Who Knew Infinity	G. H. Hardy	
2016	The Correspondence	Ed Phoerum	
2016	Race	Avery Brundage	
2016	Batman v Superman: Dawn of Justice	Alfred Pennyworth	
2016	Their Finest	Secretary of War	
2016	Assassin's Creed	Alan Rikkin	
2017	Birds Like Us	Kondor/Mi	Voice
2017	Justice League	Alfred Pennyworth	
2018	Red Sparrow	Vladimir Korchnoi	
2018	Better Start Running	Garrison	Also executive producer
2018	An Actor Prepares	Atticus Smith	
2020	Love, Weddings & Other Disasters	Lawrence Phillips	
2021	Zack Snyder's Justice League	Alfred Pennyworth	Director's cut of Justice League
2021	Munich – The Edge of War	Neville Chamberlain	
2021	House of Gucci	Rodolfo Gucci	
2023	The Flash	Alfred Pennyworth	
2023	The Cello	Francesco	
2023	Once Upon a Studio	Scar	Voice; Short film
2024	The Beekeeper	Wallace Westwyld	
2025	Palestine 36	High Commissioner Wauchope	
2026	The Crystal Planet	Governor Mordokan	Voice
2027	The Beekeeper 2 †	Wallace Westwyld	Post-production
TBA	Rizana – A Caged Bird †	Julian Miles	Post-production
TBA	Highlander †	The leader of the Watchers	Filming

== Television ==
Year	Title	Role	Notes
1971	The Rivals of Sherlock Holmes	Nephew George	Episode: "The Case of the Mirror of Portugal"
1974	The Pallisers	Frank Tregear	6 episodes
1974	Notorious Woman	Franz Liszt	2 episodes
1975	Churchill's People	Samuel Ross	Episode: "Liberty Tree"
1977	Love for Lydia	Alex Sanderson	7 episodes
1978	Play of the Week (BBC2)	Otto Beck	Episode: Langrishe, Go Down
1979	Play of the Month (BBC2)	Edward Voysey	Episode: The Voysey Inheritance
1981	Brideshead Revisited	Charles Ryder	11 episodes
1983	The Captain's Doll	Captain Alex Hepworth	Television film
1989	The Dream	The Man	Television short
1990	The Civil War	Various roles	Voices; 9 episodes
1991	Saturday Night Live	Himself (host)	Episode: "Jeremy Irons/Fishbone"
1992	Performance	Odon Von Horvath	Episode: "Tales from Hollywood"
1996	The Great War and the Shaping of the 20th Century	Siegfried Sassoon	Voice; 3 episodes
2000	Longitude	Rupert Gould	4 episodes
2001	The Short Life of Anne Frank	Narrator	Television documentary
2002	Last Call	F. Scott Fitzgerald	Television film
2003	Comic Relief 2003: The Big Hair Do	Severus Snape	Television special
2005	Elizabeth I	Robert Dudley, 1st Earl of Leicester	2 episodes
2008	The Colour of Magic	Havelock Vetinari	2 episodes
2009	The Magic 7	Thraxx	Voice; Television film
2009	Georgia O'Keeffe	Alfred Stieglitz	Television film
2010	Arena	Various Characters	Episode: "Harold Pinter: A Celebration"
2011	Law & Order: Special Victims Unit	Dr. Cap Jackson	2 episodes
2011–13	The Borgias	Rodrigo Borgia	29 episodes
2012	The Simpsons	Bar Rag	Voice; Episode: "Moe Goes from Rags to Riches"
2012	Henry IV Part I and Part II	Henry IV	2 episodes
2013	Life on Fire	Narrator	6 episodes
2019	Watchmen	Adrian Veidt	8 episodes
2021	Napoleon – In the Name of Art	Presenting narrator	Documentary
2021	The Emirates from Above	Narrator	Documentary
2022	The Pentaverate	Narrator	6 episodes
2024	The Count of Monte Cristo	Abbé Faria	8 episodes
2025	Nature	Narrator	Episode: “Dracula’s Hidden Kingdom”
2025	The Morning Show	Martin Levy	Recurring

== Video games ==
Year	Title	Role	Notes
2026	Grand Theft Auto VI	DJ Dicky	Voice role; Kaleidoscope FM host

== See also ==
- List of awards and nominations received by Jeremy Irons
- List of British actors
- List of Academy Award winners and nominees from Great Britain
- List of actors with Academy Award nominations
- List of Primetime Emmy Award winners
- List of Golden Globe winners
