= List of fictional elephants =

This list of fictional elephants is a subsidiary to the list of fictional ungulates. Characters from various fictional works are organized by medium. General information on the topic can be found at the cultural depictions of elephants. Non-fictional elephants are listed at list of individual elephants.

This list also includes extinct mammals such as woolly mammoths, mastodons, etc.

== Literature ==
Name	Species	Author	Work	Notes
Babar	Elephant	Jean de Brunhoff	Babar the Elephant	An elephant king.
Hathi	Asian elephant	Rudyard Kipling	The Jungle Book	Head of the jungle elephant troop; featured in several adventures with the boy, Mowgli.
Horton	Elephant	Dr. Seuss	Horton Hears a Who!	A fictional character from the books Horton Hatches the Egg and Horton Hears a Who!, both by Dr. Seuss.
Kabumpo	Elephant	Ruth Thompson	Kabumpo in Oz	Also known as the Elegant Elephant of Pumperdink he was originally a christening gift to the king of Pumperdink, Pompus.
Kala Nag	Asian elephant	Rudyard Kipling	"Toomai of the Elephants"	"Legendary seventy-year old" elephant and "best friend" of titular boy mahout Toomai, Kala Nag was characterized by film historian Richard Meran Barsam as wise, fearless and well-travelled, and attested a "strong personality" typical for Kipling's animal characters. Kala Nag had already been the elephant of Toomai's family for generations, which researcher in colonial studies Jeannine Woods, talking about the movie version named Elephant Boy from 1937, saw as an image for "the timeless, unchanging nature of primitive society and tradition." She also compared the relationship of Kala Nag to Toomai with that of the boy and his English paternal figure Peterson, with the formers' talents being guided to fruition by the well-meaning colonizer.
Pellefant	Toy elephant	Rune Andréasson	Pellefant books and comics	A small blue toy elephant created by Swedish cartoonist Rune Andréasson, first published 1954.
Tantor	African elephant	Edgar Rice Burroughs	Tarzan	

== Mythology ==
Name	Species	Origin	Notes
Airavata	Elephant	Indian mythology	The creator of clouds.
Ganesha	Elephant God	Indian mythology	A god with human body, four arms and an elephant's head.
Gajendra	Elephant God	Indian mythology	An elephant who was attacked by a crocodile and eventually saved by Vishnu.
Supratika	One of eight elephants who bears the world	Indian mythology	Supratika represents the northeast direction of the world.
Vinayaki	Elephant-headed Hindu Goddess	Indian mythology	An elephant-headed goddess about whom little is known but is thought to be a feminine avatar of Ganesha.

== Visual Media ==
=== Television ===
Name	Species	Origin	Notes
Mr. Snuffleupagus	Snuffleupagus	Sesame Street	Big Bird's once thought imaginary friend.

=== Animation ===
Name	Species	Origin	Notes
Elmer Elephant	Elephant	Silly Symphonies	Disney cartoon short. (Not to be confused with Elmer the Patchwork Elephant)

== Other ==
- Ellie the Elephant, Mascot for the WNBA Basketball team the NY Liberty
- Nellie the Elephant, a children's song about the eponymous elephant
- Welephant, a red elephant cartoon character with a fireman's helmet; icon for promoting fire safety to children, and mascot for the Children's Burn Trust.

== Works named after fictional elephants ==
Some of these works have alternative titles that do not mention the fictional elephant(s).

Title	Medium	Author/Creator/Producer	Year	Notes
Bump	Animation	Charles Mills, Terry Brain	1990	
CJ's Elephant Antics	Video game	Genesis, Big Red (Spectrum)	1991	
Dumbo	Film	Walt Disney	1941	
The Elephant's Journey	Novel	José Saramago	2008	
Ella the Elephant	Animation	Carmela D'Amico and Steven D'Amico	2013	A Canadian animated preschool television series about a jolly young elephant who wears a big red hat and a blue criss-cross dress.
Elmer the Elephant	TV series	John Conrad	1951	
Elmer the Patchwork Elephant	Book series	David McKee	1968	
Goliath II	Film	Walt Disney	1960	
Khan Kluay	Film	Aummaraporn Phandintong	2006	
Rolo to the Rescue	Video game	Vectordean	1993	
Tembo the Badass Elephant	Video game	Game Freak	2015	
Thunder: An Elephant's Journey	Book series	Erik Daniel Shein, L. M. Reker	2016	
Whispers: An Elephant's Tale	Film	Beverly Joubert, Dereck Joubert	2000	
Zenobia	Film	Gordon Douglas, Corey Ford	1939	

== See also ==
- Lists of fictional animals
- List of individual elephants
- Cultural depictions of elephants

== Notes ==
References
