= Tim T. Kelly =

- Born: Timothy T. Kelly
- Education: University of Colorado Boulder
- Occupations: Media executive, film producer, conservationist

Timothy "Tim" T. Kelly is an American media executive, film producer, and conservationist. He is recognized for his role in moving the National Geographic Society from a primarily print-based organization to a multimedia global force in television and digital media. Kelly engineered the launch of the National Geographic Channel in 1997, and was named President of National Geographic in 2011. He also served as president and CEO of the National Geographic Global Media group and president and CEO of National Geographic Ventures. Kelly announced he would be leaving National Geographic in September 2012.

== Career at National Geographic Society ==
Kelly joined the National Geographic Society as an executive producer in its television division. In 1985, he created the award-winning National Geographic Explorer series and went on to serve as President of National Geographic Television. Under his leadership, the National Geographic Television won 138 Emmy Awards.

In 1997, Kelly oversaw the development of the National Geographic Channel. The channel was launched in Europe and Australia initially, and expanded into the United States in 2001. As of 2012, it has a presence in 173 countries. In 2012, he also presided over the launch of Nat Geo WILD, a sister channel focused on animal-related programs.

Kelly also created National Geographic Films—which won an Academy Award for March of the Penguins (2005) and received an Oscar nomination for Restrepo (2010)—and National Geographic Cinema Ventures group, which distributes films to both theatrical and giant-screen movie outlets globally. He was executive producer of Imax Films such as: Mysteries of Egypt, Lions 3D, Forces of Nature, Sea Monsters: A Prehistoric Adventure, The Last Lions and Lewis & Clark.

== Personal life and education ==
An avid outdoorsman, Kelly is recognized for his work in developing the role of storytelling in conservation. He serves on the board of the American Prairie Foundation, a private nonprofit that is creating a wildlife conservation area of 3,500,000 acres (14,000 km2) in northeast Montana through a combination of private and public lands.

Kelly also serves on the board of Great Plains Conservation Trust, which is dedicated to perfecting ecotourism as conservation movement. The Trust manages over one million acres of African wilderness as well as safari camps that work to preserve the natural habitats of iconic wildlife and to support local people.

Tim Kelly grew up in Colorado and earned a Bachelor of Arts degree in finance from the University of Colorado Boulder. He attended the University of Colorado Denver for graduate studies in marketing.
