= Dereck Joubert =

South African-born filmmaker

- Born: 3 March 1956 (age 70); Johannesburg, South Africa
- Occupation: Filmmaker
- Spouse: Beverly Joubert
- Relatives: Keith Joubert (brother)

Dereck Joubert (born 3 March 1956) is a South African-born filmmaker, author, conservationist and National Geographic explorer-at-large based in Botswana. He is also the brother of South African artist and conservationist Keith Joubert.

== Personal life ==
Joubert was born in Johannesburg, South Africa. He studied geology and land surveying at the University of Witwatersrand, and later completed a diploma in ecology. While working as a wildlife ranger in several South African wildlife reserves, he first developed an interest in lion behaviour.

In March 2017, the Jouberts survived a near-fatal Cape buffalo attack at their camp in Botswana's Okavango Delta.

== Film career ==
Dereck and Beverly Joubert have co-produced over 40 films for National Geographic, with Dereck writing and operating the camera and Beverly recording sound. Their work has contributed to new understandings of Africa's top predators.

The Jouberts’ films have received awards including Emmys, a Peabody Award, and Wildscreen Panda Awards. Their Emmy-winning 2006 film Eye of the Leopard follows the life of a female leopard from infancy to maturity.

In 2014, the Jouberts received the Lifetime Achievement Award at the South African Film and Television Awards.

== Conservation work ==
In 2006, the Joubert's founded Great Plains Conservation, an organization that operates safari camps in Botswana, Kenya, and Zimbabwe. The organization combines tourism with conservation initiatives and community projects. The Great Plains Foundation, the company's charity arm, extends to community work, including feeding over 11,800 children each day, sending women to India for training, supporting schools and teachers, running conservation camps for kids, and building bridges.

In 2009, the Joubert's co-founded the Big Cats Initiative with National Geographic, aimed at halting the decline of big cats and protecting their ecosystems. This program has transitioned to the Great Plains Big Cats Initiative under their leadership.

The Jouberts also co-founded Rhinos Without Borders, which has relocated 87 rhinos from high-poaching areas to safer regions. During the COVID-19 pandemic, they established Project Ranger to support rangers and conservationists across Africa.
