= Whispers: An Elephant's Tale =

2000 film by Derek Joubert

- Theatrical release poster
- Directed by: Dereck Joubert
- Screenplay by: Dereck Joubert; Jordan Moffet; Holly Goldberg Sloan
- Story by: Dereck Joubert; Beverly Joubert
- Produced by: Beverly Joubert; Dereck Joubert
- Starring: Angela Bassett; Joanna Lumley; Anne Archer; Debi Derryberry; Kevin Michael Richardson
- Cinematography: Dereck Joubert
- Edited by: Nena Olwage
- Music by: Trevor Rabin
- Production company: Walt Disney Pictures
- Distributed by: Buena Vista Pictures Distribution
- Release date: March 10, 2000
- Running time: 72 minutes
- Country: United States
- Language: English
- Budget: $4,000,000 (estimated)
- Box office: $500,000 (USA) (30 November 2000)

Whispers: An Elephant's Tale is a 2000 American adventure film co-written, co-produced and directed by Dereck Joubert and featuring the voice work of Angela Bassett, Joanna Lumley, Anne Archer, Debi Derryberry and Kevin Michael Richardson.

== Plot ==
A baby elephant is getting used to life in the herd, until the poachers (referred as "takers" by the elephants) separate him from his mother, Gentle Heart (thought to be killed by them), so he runs and gets lost. He is found by a grouchy female named Groove, the sister of an alpha-female named Half Tusk, who walks off disgusted with life in her herd. She reluctantly takes the orphan under her wing, promising to find his herd. Yet, she fails to locate his original herd, a suitable home with other bulls (who deem him disrespectful and mouthy), or even a place within her own herd, which nicknames him "Whispers" because of his weak trumpeting. Meanwhile, the fear for poachers and lions drives them north over the great river, a long and dangerous journey. Groove manages to save Whispers from a pride of lionesses one night.

After a harsh encounter another night with poachers this time, Groove manages to save Whispers from them but ends up fatally wounded in the morning by their gunshots. Whispers is able to find help from Groove's herd. But even with Half Tusk's help, Groove can't be saved. So, she tells Whispers to continue the journey with her herd, entrusting Whispers to their care.

After days of traveling, the elephant herd, with Whispers as the rear guard, finally reach the Great River, but their happiness is later cut short when the same poachers reappear. Whispers finally learns to trumpet, warning the herd just in time. They manage to give the hunters the slip by swimming to the other side of the river, all except for Princess, Half Tusk's somewhat spoiled and cynical daughter, who gets stuck by a log in the river and is left behind. Whispers manages to save Princess from both the log and a hungry crocodile. Then, he and Princess dive underwater, holding their breath and fooling the poachers into believing they've been shot.

Once the poachers are gone, Whispers and Princess resurface and join the rest of the herd. Half Tusk welcomes Whispers into the family, and all the other elephants, including Princess, now accept him. Then, Princess notices an elephant heading their way on the other side of the river and thinks they "may have been left behind." Whispers and the herd call out for the new elephant to join them as Whispers trumpets again so as not to let the poachers see her.

Once the elephant reaches them, she asks if Whispers trumpeted like that, and he says yes and asks why she is all alone. The elephant then tells him that his trumpet is that of a "strong heart". Whispers recognizes it as something his mother used to tell him, and it is finally revealed that the elephant herself is actually his mother, who has been searching for him for a long time after she managed to escape the hunters at the beginning.

With Whispers happily reunited with his mother and both accepted into the elephant herd, they continue to live their lives. Whispers continues to learn more about the outside world as the story comes to end while stating that "it doesn't take the voices of giants to change the world. Sometimes, it can all start with a whisper."

== Cast ==
- Angela Bassett as Groove
- Joanna Lumley as Half Tusk
- Anne Archer as Gentle Heart
- Debi Derryberry as Whispers
- Kevin Michael Richardson as Adult Whispers and Narrator
- Alice Ghostley as Tuskless
- Betty White as Round
- Kat Cressida as Princess
- Joan Rivers as Spike
- John DiMaggio as Tough Tusk/Fulla Bull
- Tone Loc as Macho Bull
- Jeannie Elias as Stranger/Herd Elephant
- Jim Black, Joseph Molekoa, David Mabukane, and Sandor Carter as the Poachers

== Production ==
Whispers: An Elephant's Tale was filmed in Botswana over a period of 18 months. Only the elephants portraying Whispers and Groove were trained animals. All the other elephants in the film were actually filmed in the wild.

== Reception ==
Frank Lovece of TV Guide gave the film two out of four star and stated: "Real-life nature photography, rather than the usual trained animal performances, makes up the bulk of this debut fiction film from Dereck and Beverly Joubert, the husband-and-wife deans of wildlife documentary. Yet, despite some remarkable footage, this children's tale of an anthropomorphized young pachyderm searching for his mother contains less originality and emotion than any Babar story.

On review aggregation website Metacritic the film has a score of 30 out of 100, based on reviews from 5 critics, indicating "generally unfavorable reviews".

== Home media ==
The film was released on VHS and DVD on October 23, 2001 and became available to stream on Disney+ upon the service's launch on November 12, 2019.
