= Jeremy Irons =

British actor (born 1948)

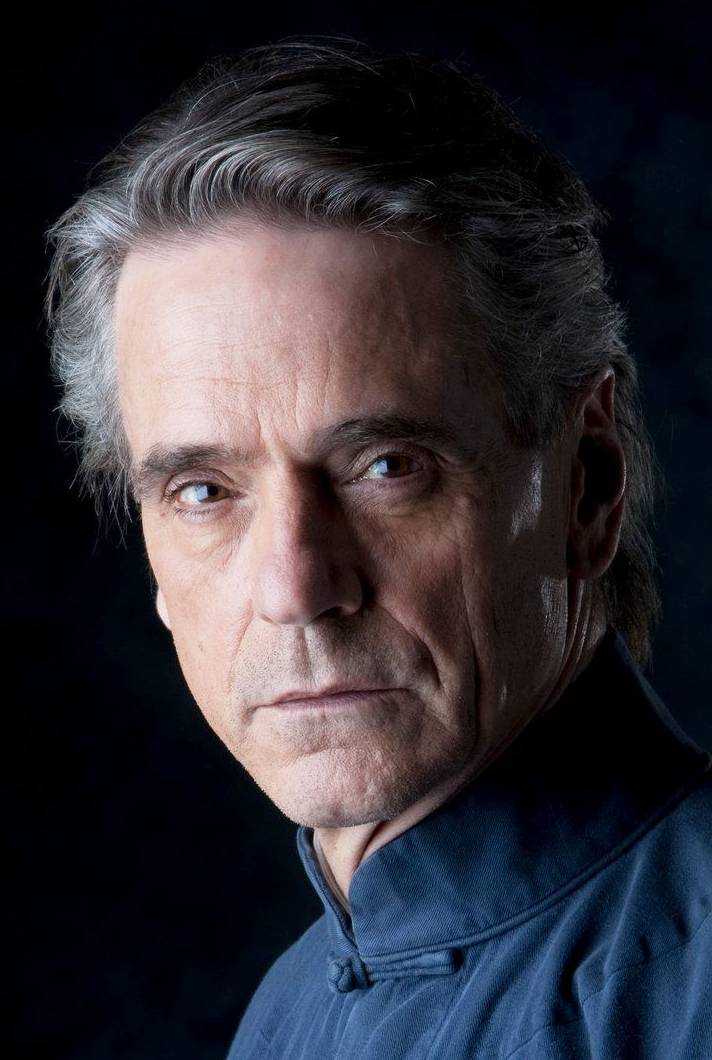
- Irons in 2014
- Born: Jeremy John Irons; 19 September 1948 (age 78); Cowes, Isle of Wight, England
- Education: Bristol Old Vic Theatre School
- Occupation: Actor
- Years active: 1969–present
- Works: Full list
- Spouses: Julie Hallam (m. 1970; div. 1971) Sinéad Cusack (m. 1978)
- Children: 2, including Max
- Awards: Full list

Jeremy John Irons (/ˈaɪ.ərnz/; born 19 September 1948) is an English actor. Known for his roles on stage and screen, he has received numerous accolades including an Academy Award, a Tony Award, three Primetime Emmy Awards, and two Golden Globe Awards, being one of just 24 actors who have achieved the Triple Crown of Acting.

Irons received classical training at the Bristol Old Vic Theatre School and started his acting career on stage in 1969. He appeared in many West End theatre productions, including the Shakespeare plays The Winter's Tale, Macbeth, Much Ado About Nothing, The Taming of the Shrew, and Richard II. In 1984, he made his Broadway debut in Tom Stoppard's The Real Thing, receiving the Tony Award for Best Actor in a Play.

His first major film role came in The French Lieutenant's Woman (1981), for which he received a BAFTA Award for Best Actor nomination. After starring in dramas such as Moonlighting (1982), Betrayal (1983), The Mission (1986), and Dead Ringers (1988), he received the Academy Award for Best Actor for his portrayal of Claus von Bülow in Reversal of Fortune (1990). Other notable films include Kafka (1991), Damage (1992), M. Butterfly (1993), Die Hard with a Vengeance (1995), Lolita (1997), The Man in the Iron Mask (1998), Dungeons & Dragons (2000), The Merchant of Venice (2004), Kingdom of Heaven (2005), Eragon (2006), Appaloosa (2008), The Pink Panther 2 (2009), Margin Call (2011), The Words (2012) and The Man Who Knew Infinity (2015). He voiced Scar in Disney's The Lion King (1994) and played Alfred Pennyworth in the DC Extended Universe (2016–2023) franchise.

On television, Irons's breakthrough role came playing Charles Ryder in the ITV series Brideshead Revisited (1981), receiving nominations for the BAFTA TV Award, Primetime Emmy Award, Golden Globe Award for Best Actor. He received the Primetime Emmy Award for his portrayal of Robert Dudley, 1st Earl of Leicester in the HBO miniseries Elizabeth I (2005) and was Emmy-nominated for playing Adrian Veidt in HBO's Watchmen (2019). He starred as Pope Alexander VI in the Showtime historical series The Borgias (2011–2013). In October 2011, he was named the Goodwill Ambassador for the UN's Food and Agriculture Organization.

== Early life and education ==
Jeremy John Irons was born on 19 September 1948 in Cowes on the Isle of Wight, to Paul Dugan Irons, an accountant, and Barbara Anne Brereton Brymer (née Sharpe). Irons has a brother and a sister. He was educated at the independent Sherborne School in Dorset from 1962 to 1966. He was the drummer and harmonica player in a four-man school band called the Four Pillars of Wisdom.

== Career ==
=== 1969–1979: Early work and theatre roles ===
Irons trained as an actor at the Bristol Old Vic Theatre School and later became president of its fundraising appeal. He performed many plays, and busked on the streets of Bristol, before appearing on the London stage as John the Baptist and Judas opposite David Essex in Godspell, which opened at the Roundhouse on 17 November 1971 before transferring to Wyndham's Theatre playing a total of 1,128 performances. Irons's television career began on British television in the early 1970s, including appearances on the children's series Play Away and as Franz Liszt in the BBC series Notorious Woman (1974). More significantly, he starred in the 13-part adaptation of H. E. Bates's novel Love for Lydia (1977) for London Weekend Television, and attracted attention for his key role as the pipe-smoking German student, a romantic pairing with Judi Dench, in Harold Pinter's screenplay adaptation of Aidan Higgins's novel Langrishe, Go Down (1978) for BBC Television. Irons has worked with the Royal Shakespeare Company three times in 1976, 1986–1987 and 2010.

After years of success in the West End in London, Irons made his New York debut as Henry, a man engaging in an affair in the Tom Stoppard play The Real Thing at the Plymouth Theatre on Broadway acting opposite Glenn Close. Irons won the Tony Award for Best Actor in a Play. Frank Rich of The New York Times wrote, "Given the sublime cast led by Mr. Irons and Glenn Close - and the bravura force of Mike Nichols's direction - any repeat viewings are likely to be as dazzling as the first". He added "Mr. Irons...has never been better: he captures Henry's magnetic public charm, then goes on to reveal the suffering and longing within."

=== 1980–1999: Breakthrough and film stardom ===
The role which significantly raised his profile was Charles Ryder in the television adaptation of Evelyn Waugh's Brideshead Revisited (1981). First broadcast on ITV, the show ranks among the most successful British television dramas, with Irons receiving nominations for the British Academy Television Award, the Primetime Emmy Award, and the Golden Globe Award for Best Actor. Brideshead reunited him with Anthony Andrews, with whom he had appeared in The Pallisers seven years earlier. Around the same time, he starred in the film The French Lieutenant's Woman (also 1981) opposite Meryl Streep. Vincent Canby of The New York Times compared him to a young Laurence Olivier writing, "Mr. Irons seems to be one of the few actors today who could be so completely convincing as the Victorian lover who thinks he's ahead of his time, being a follower of Darwin and a socially enlightened member of his privileged class, but who finds, ultimately, that he still has a long way to go."

After these major successes, he played the leading role of an exiled Polish building contractor, working in the Twickenham area of southwest London, in Jerzy Skolimowski's independent film Moonlighting (1982). Irons made his film debut in Nijinsky in 1980. In addition, he appeared in the Cannes Palme d'Or winner The Mission in 1986 and in the dual role of twin gynecologists in David Cronenberg's Dead Ringers alongside Geneviève Bujold in 1988. Irons would later win Best Actor for Dead Ringers from the New York Film Critics Circle that year. On 23 March 1991, he hosted Saturday Night Live on NBC in the US, and appeared as Sherlock Holmes in the Sherlock Holmes' Surprise Party sketch. In 1985, Irons directed a music video for Carly Simon and her heavily promoted single, "Tired of Being Blonde", and in 1994, he had a cameo role in the video for Elastica's hit single "Connection".

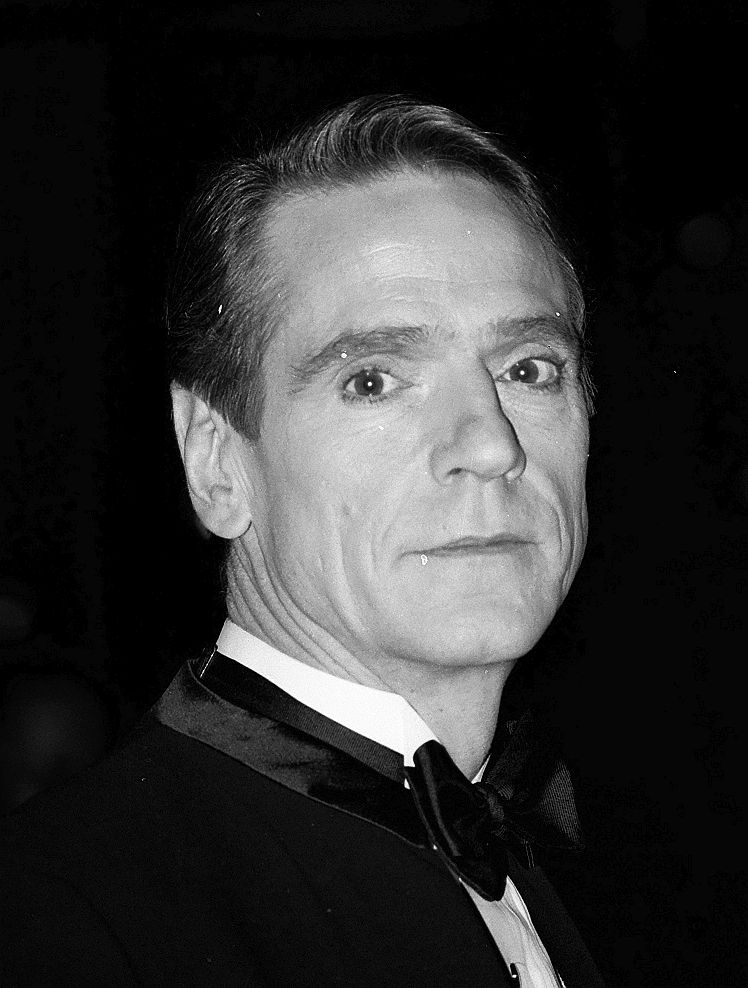
Irons in 1999

Irons has contributed to other musical performances, recording William Walton's Façade with Dame Peggy Ashcroft, Stravinsky's L'Histoire du Soldat conducted by the composer, and in 1987 the songs from Lerner and Loewe's My Fair Lady with Dame Kiri Te Kanawa, released on the Decca label. In 1994, Irons lent his distinctive voice to the antagonist Scar in the Walt Disney Animated film The Lion King (1994), where it became one of his best-known film roles. In the film Irons sang segments of "Be Prepared". He acted alongside Matthew Broderick, Nathan Lane, James Earl Jones, Rowan Atkinson and Whoopi Goldberg. Irons has since provided voiceovers for three Disney World attractions. He narrated the Spaceship Earth ride, housed in the large geodesic globe at Epcot in Florida from October 1994 to July 2007. He was also the English narrator for the Studio Tram Tour: Behind the Magic at the Walt Disney Studios Park at Disneyland Paris. He voiced H. G. Wells in the English-language version of the former Disney attraction The Timekeeper. He also reprised his role as Scar in Fantasmic. He is also one of the readers in the 4x CD boxed set of The Fairy Tales of Oscar Wilde, produced by Marc Sinden and sold in aid of the Royal Theatrical Fund.

He serves as the English-language version of the audio guide for Westminster Abbey in London. He voiced English soldier and WWI poet Siegfried Sassoon in The Great War and the Shaping of the 20th Century (1997), receiving the Primetime Emmy Award for Outstanding Voice-Over Performance. Other films include Danny the Champion of the World (1989), Reversal of Fortune (1990), for which he won the Academy Award for Best Actor, Kafka (1991), Damage (1993), M. Butterfly (1993) working again with David Cronenberg, The House of the Spirits (1993) appearing again with Glenn Close, Meryl Streep, Winona Ryder and Antonio Banderas. Afterwards, he portrayed Simon Gruber in Die Hard with a Vengeance (1995), co-starring Bruce Willis and Samuel L. Jackson. He also featured in Bernardo Bertolucci's Stealing Beauty (1996), Chinese Box (1997), the 1997 remake of Lolita, and the 1998 film version of The Man in the Iron Mask, playing the musketeer Aramis share credit with Leonardo DiCaprio, John Malkovich, Gérard Depardieu and Gabriel Byrne.

=== 2000–2010: Being Julia, Elizabeth I and roles in blockbusters ===
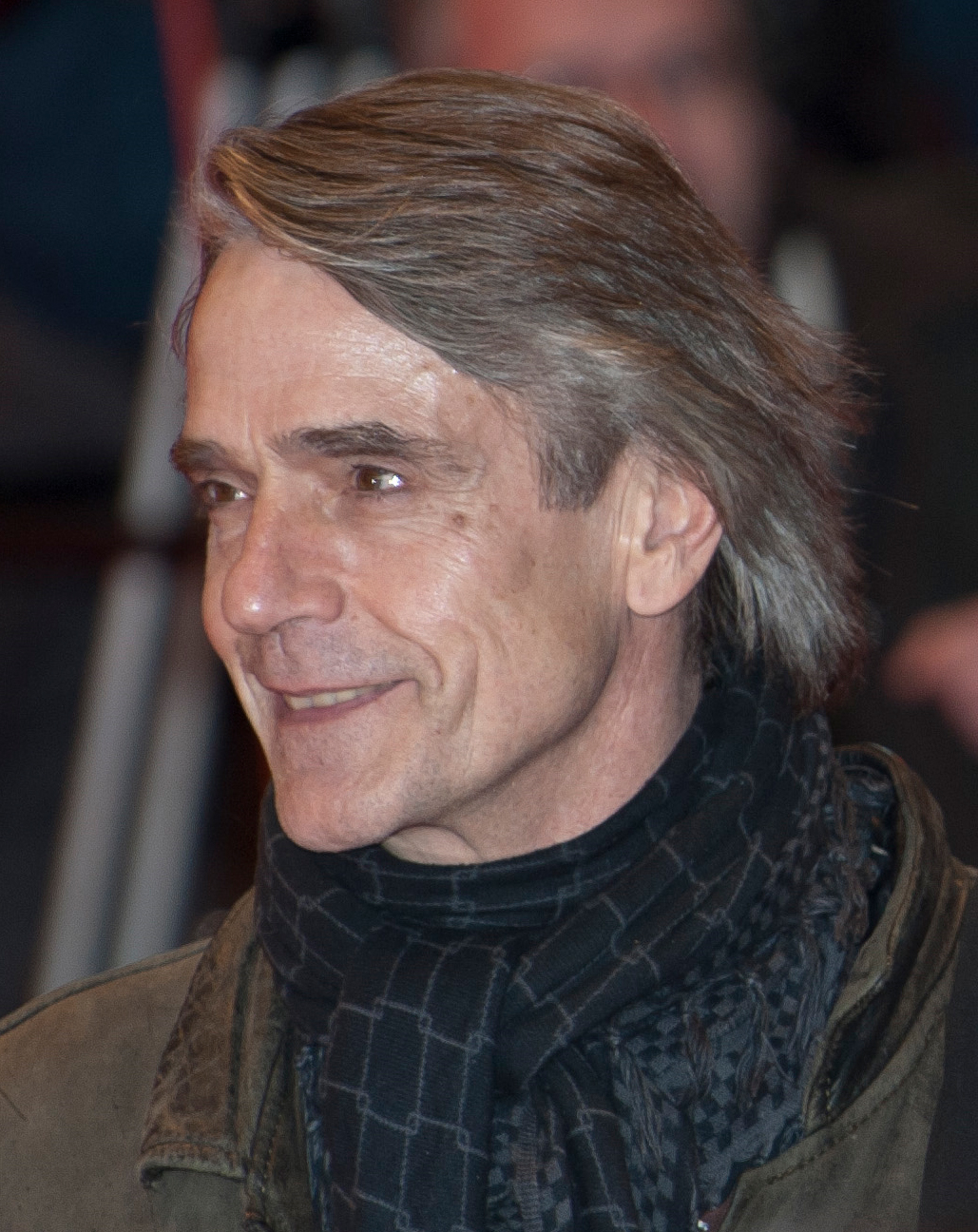
Irons at the Berlin International Film Festival in 2011

To mark the 100th anniversary of Noël Coward's birth, Irons sang a selection of his songs at the 1999 Last Night of the Proms held at the Royal Albert Hall in London, ending with "London Pride", a patriotic song written in the spring of 1941 during the Blitz. In 2003, Irons played Fredrik Egerman in a New York revival of Stephen Sondheim's A Little Night Music, and two years later appeared as King Arthur in Lerner and Loewe's Camelot at the Hollywood Bowl. He performed the Bob Dylan song "Make You Feel My Love" on the 2006 charity album Unexpected Dreams – Songs From the Stars. Other roles include the wicked wizard Profion in the film Dungeons and Dragons (2000) and Rupert Gould in Longitude (2000). He played the Über-Morlock in the film The Time Machine (2002). In 2004, Irons played the title character in The Merchant of Venice. In 2005, he appeared in the films Casanova opposite Heath Ledger, and Ridley Scott's Kingdom of Heaven. He reunited with his The Man in the Iron Mask co-star John Malkovich in Eragon (2006), though they didn't have any scenes together this time. In 2004 Irons played Severus Snape in the BBC's Comic Relief's Harry Potter parody, "Harry Potter and the Secret Chamberpot of Azerbaijan".

In 2004, he starred in István Szabó's Being Julia opposite Annette Bening, receiving a Satellite Award nomination for his performance. In 2005, Irons portrayed Robert Dudley, 1st Earl of Leicester in the Channel 4-HBO mini-series, Elizabeth I, in which he starred opposite Helen Mirren (Queen Elizabeth I). Rupert Smith of The Guardian praised their on-screen chemistry, writing, "Mirren and Irons are a screen marriage made in heaven, and when they let rip with the thwarted passion all might have been well." Irons won both a Primetime Emmy Award for Outstanding Supporting Actor in a Limited Series or Movie and a Golden Globe Award for Best Supporting Actor – Series, Miniseries or Television Film for his performance.

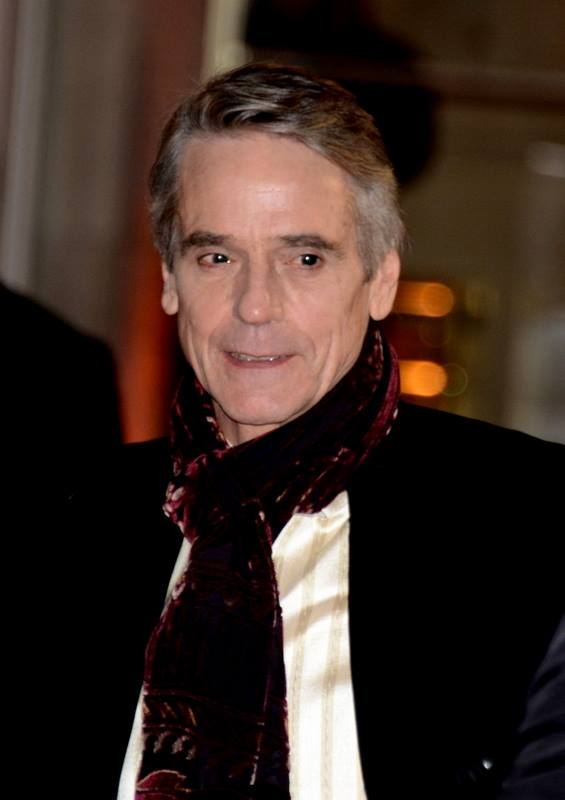
Irons at the César Awards in 2014

A year later, he participated in the third series of the BBC documentary series Who Do You Think You Are? In 2008, he played Lord Havelock Vetinari in Terry Pratchett's The Colour of Magic, an adaptation for Sky One. In 2006, Irons appeared with Laura Dern in David Lynch's Inland Empire. After an absence from the London stage for 18 years, in 2006 he co-starred with Patrick Malahide in Christopher Hampton's stage adaptation of Sándor Márai's novel Embers at the Duke of York's Theatre. He made his National Theatre debut playing former British Prime Minister Harold Macmillan (1957–1963) in Never So Good, a new play by Howard Brenton which opened at the Lyttelton on 19 March 2008. In 2009, Irons appeared on Broadway opposite Joan Allen in the play Impressionism. The play ran through 10 May 2009 at the Gerald Schoenfeld Theater.

In 2008, Irons co-starred with Ed Harris and Viggo Mortensen in the western drama Appaloosa, directed by Harris. On 6 November 2008, TV Guide reported Irons would star as photographer Alfred Stieglitz with Joan Allen as painter Georgia O'Keeffe, in a Lifetime Television biopic, Georgia O'Keeffe (2009). For his performance, he was nominated for the Golden Globe Award for Best Actor – Miniseries or Television Film and the Screen Actors Guild Award for Outstanding Actor in a Miniseries or Television Movie. In 2008, two researchers, a linguist and a sound engineer, found "the perfect [male] voice" to be a combination of Irons's and Alan Rickman's voices based on a sample of 50 voices. Coincidentally, the two actors played brothers in the Die Hard series of films. Speaking at 200 words per minute and pausing for 1.2 seconds between sentences, Irons came very close to the ideal voice model, with the linguist Andrew Linn explaining why his "deep gravelly tones" inspired trust in listeners.

In 2009, Irons appeared on the Touchstone album Wintercoast, recording a narrative introduction to the album. Recording took place in New York City in February 2009 during rehearsals for his Broadway play Impressionism. As German villain Simon Gruber his recital of the English riddle "As I was going to St Ives" (from Die Hard with a Vengeance) appears in the 2014 book The Art of Communicating Eloquently. In 2017, he recited the spoken sections, most notably "Late Lament", for The Moody Blues' 50th Anniversary Tour of "Days Of Future Passed", and also appears on the video presentation. Irons also appeared in the documentary for Irish television channel TG4, Faoi Lán Cheoil, in which he is seen taking fiddle lessons from Caoimhín Ó Raghallaigh.

=== Since 2011: Television work ===
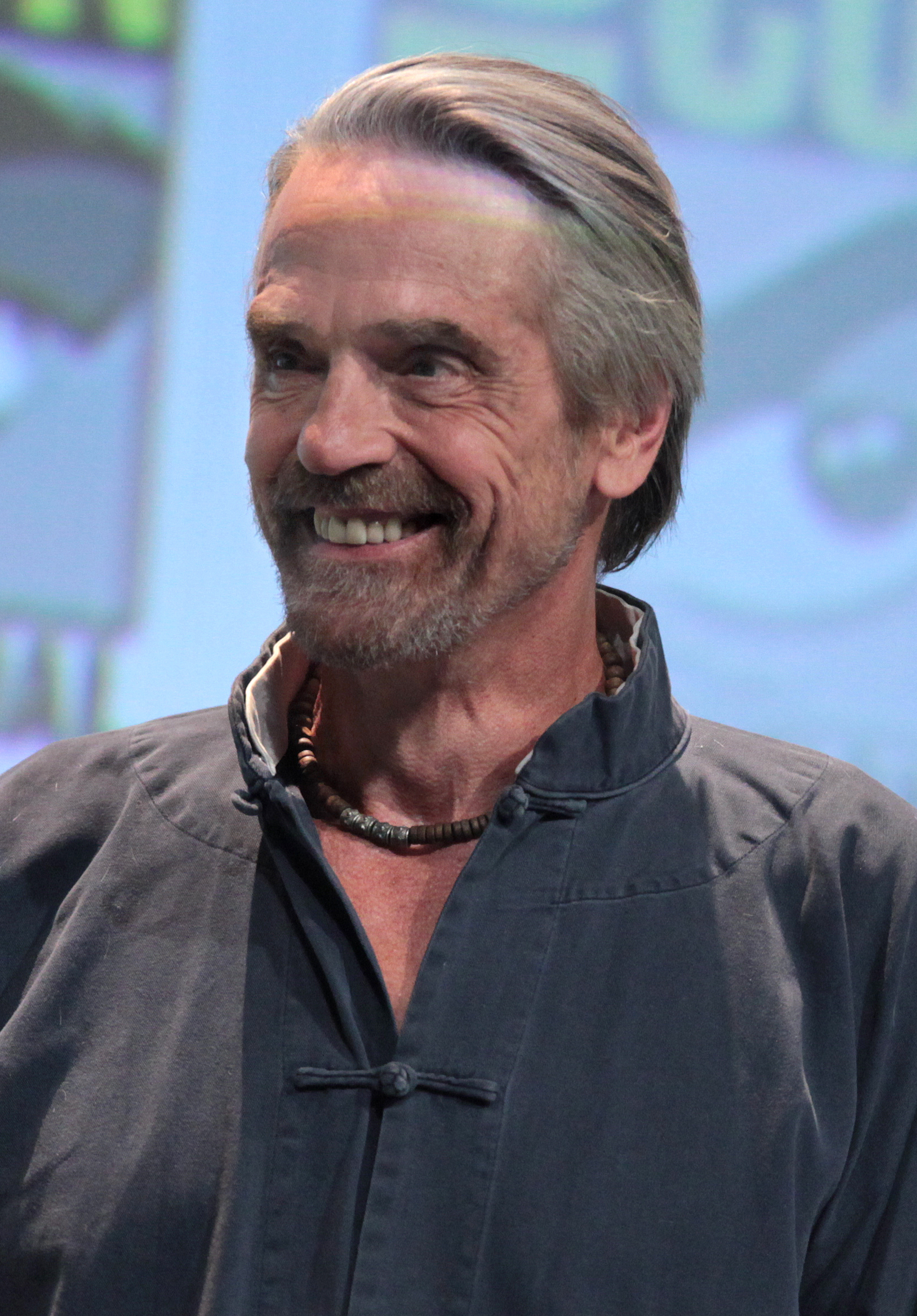
Irons in 2015

In 2011, Irons appeared alongside Kevin Spacey in the thriller Margin Call. On 12 January 2011, Irons was a guest-star in an episode of Law & Order: Special Victims Unit called "Mask". He played Dr. Cap Jackson, a sex therapist. He reprised the role on an episode titled "Totem" that ran on 30 March 2011. Irons stars in the 2011 US premium cable network Showtime's series The Borgias, a highly fictionalised account of the Renaissance dynasty of that name. Directing him in The Merchant of Venice, Michael Radford states Irons "has such a magnetic quality on screen, and he has a kind of melancholy about him." Irons has served as voice-over in several big cat documentary films (multiple by National Geographic): Eye of the Leopard (2006), The Last Lions (2011), The Unlikely Leopard (2012), Game of Lions (2014), for which he received the Primetime Emmy Award for Outstanding Narrator, Jade Eyed Leopard (2020), Revealed: Ultimate Enemies (2022), and Revealed: Eternal Enemies (2022). He narrated the French-produced docuseries about volcanoes, Life on Fire (2009–2012).

In 2012, he starred and worked as executive producer of the environmental documentary film Trashed. Irons has had extensive voice work in a range of different fields throughout his career. He read the audiobook recording of Evelyn Waugh's Brideshead Revisited, Paulo Coelho's The Alchemist, Vladimir Nabokov's Lolita (he had also appeared in the 1997 film version of the novel), and James and the Giant Peach by the children's author Roald Dahl. In particular, he was praised for recording the poetry of T. S. Eliot for BBC Radio 4. Beginning in 2012 with The Waste Land, he went on to record Four Quartets in 2014, The Love Song of J. Alfred Prufrock on the centenary of its publication in 2015, and Old Possum's Book of Practical Cats in 2016. He finally completed recording the entire canon of T. S. Eliot which was broadcast over New Year's Day 2017. In 2020, Irons was one of 40 British voices to read three to four verses (broadcast daily) of Samuel Taylor Coleridge's 150-verse 18th century poem The Rime of the Ancient Mariner. He portrayed the mathematician G. H. Hardy in the 2015 film The Man Who Knew Infinity.

Irons played Alfred Pennyworth in Warner Bros.' Batman v Superman: Dawn of Justice (2016), Justice League (2017) and the 2021 director's cut of the same film. On 8 November 2018, it was announced that Irons had been cast as Adrian Veidt / Ozymandias in HBO's Watchmen series. The series debuted earning him a Primetime Emmy Award for Outstanding Lead Actor in a Limited or Anthology Series or Movie nomination. In 2018, he played General Vladimir Korchnoi in Francis Lawrence's spy thriller film Red Sparrow, based on Jason Matthews's book of the same name. In 2021, Irons played Rodolfo Gucci in Ridley Scott's biographical crime drama film House of Gucci. In 2017, he performed with Isabelle Huppert Correspondence 1944–1959 Readings from the epistles between Albert Camus and Maria Casares and a special creation of Harold Pinter's Ashes to Ashes, at the Teatro Argentina in Rome.

In 2022, Irons played British Prime Minister Neville Chamberlain in the period spy thriller Munich – The Edge of War. The following year, he reprised the role of Alfred Pennyworth in The Flash and also returned to voice Scar in Disney's centenary animated short Once Upon a Studio. In 2024, he performed Scar's song at the Hollywood Bowl's The Lion King 30th Anniversary – A Live-to-Film Concert Event. In 2024, Irons was cast in the Apple TV+ drama series The Morning Show where he portrayed Alex Levy's (Jennifer Aniston) father for season 4.

In 2026, Irons was announced as one of the celebrities selected to participate in TIFF’s inaugural film industry project. Irons is collaborating with Deepa Mehta in the project.

He voiced the character DJ Dicky, radio host of Kaleidoscope FM, in the 2026 video game Grand Theft Auto VI.

== Political views and activism ==
At the 1991 Tony Awards, Irons was one of the few celebrities to wear the red ribbon to support the fight against AIDS. He was the first celebrity to wear it onscreen. In 1998, Irons and his wife were named in the list of the biggest private financial donors to the Labour Party, a year following its return to government with Tony Blair's victory in the 1997 general election, following eighteen years in opposition. He was also one of several celebrities who endorsed the parliamentary candidacy of the Green Party's Caroline Lucas at the 2015 general election. In 2004, he publicly declared his support for the Countryside Alliance, referring to the 2004 Hunting Act as an "outrageous assault on civil liberties" and "one of the two most devastating parliamentary votes in the last century".

Irons is an outspoken critic of the death penalty and has supported the campaign by the human rights organisation Amnesty International UK to abolish capital punishment worldwide. Among his arguments, Irons states the death penalty "infringes on two fundamental human rights, the right to life, and no-one shall be subject to torture", adding that while the person accused of a crime "may have abused those rights, to advocate the same be done to them is to join them". During a 2007 Q&A with The Guardian, Irons named Tony Blair as the living person he most admired; reasoning "For living so publicly with the knowledge that he's not perfect." He then named George W. Bush as the living person he most despised, stating "to hold his position he should have surrounded himself with more reliable people." In 2009, Irons signed a petition in support of Polish film director Roman Polanski, calling for his release after he was arrested in Switzerland in relation to his 1977 charge for drugging and raping a 13-year-old girl. In 2011, Irons was criticised in the British Medical Journal for his fundraising activities in support of the College of Medicine, an alternative medicine lobby group in the UK linked to King Charles.

In 2013, Irons caused controversy for an interview with the Huffington Post, in which he said he "doesn't have a strong feeling either way" on gay marriage but expressed fears that it could "debase marital law", suggesting it could be "manipulated" to allow fathers to avoid paying tax when passing on their estates to their sons, because he supposed "incest laws would not apply to men". He later clarified his comments, saying he was providing an example of a situation that could cause a "legal quagmire" under the laws that allow same-sex marriage, and that he had been "misinterpreted". He added that "some gay relationships are more long term, responsible and even healthier in their role of raising children, than their hetero equivalents". He said in a BBC interview that he wished he had "buttoned my lip" before asking if its legalisation would see fathers marry sons. At the 70th Berlin International Film Festival in 2020, Irons said, "I applaud the legislation of same-sex marriage, wherever it has been attained. I hope that such enlightened legislation will continue to spread into more and more societies".

Irons supports the legal availability of abortion, having said that he believes that "women should be allowed to make the decision". Irons also agreed with an abortion opponent and was quoted as saying that "the church is right to say it's a sin". In 2020, Irons said, "I support wholeheartedly the right of women to have an abortion should they so decide".

== Personal life ==
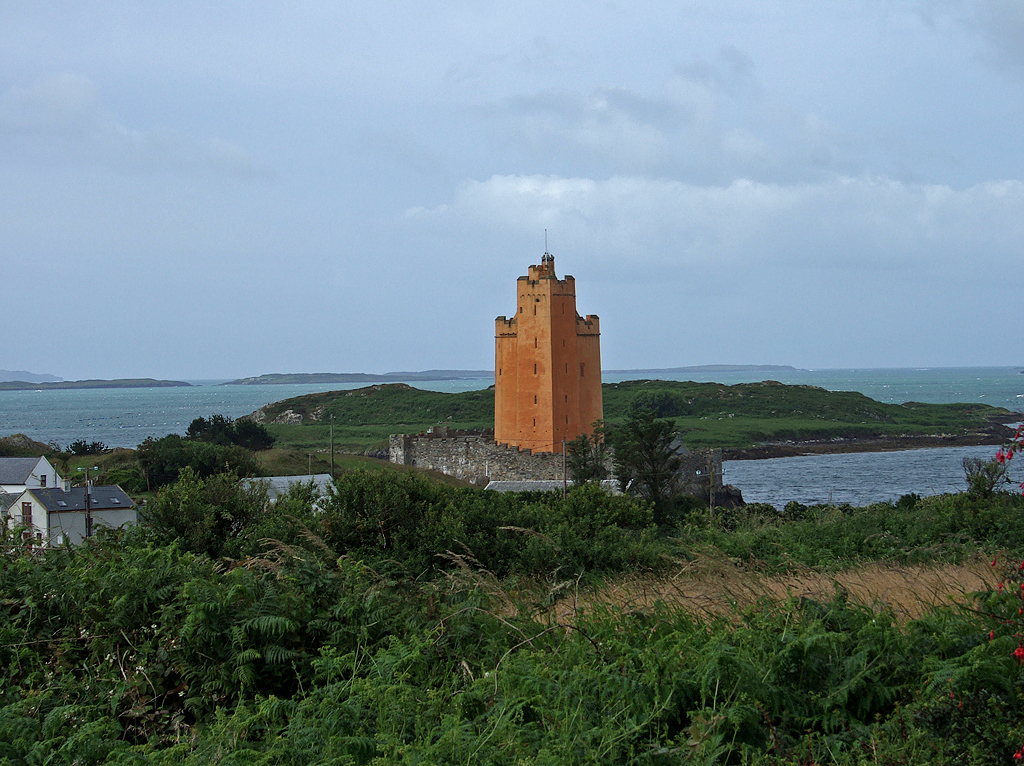
Kilcoe Castle, built c. 1450 by the Clan Dermod MacCarthy

Irons married Julie Hallam (née Smith) in 1969, but they divorced that year. He married Irish actress Sinéad Cusack on 28 March 1978. They have two sons, Samuel "Sam" Irons (born 1978), who works as a psychotherapist, and who co-starred with his father in Danny, the Champion of the World, and Maximilian "Max" Irons (born 1985), also an actor. Both of Irons's sons have appeared in films with their father. Irons's wife and children are Catholic; Irons has also been described as a practising Catholic, yet has stated:

I don't go to church much because I don't like belonging to a club, and I don't go to confession or anything like that, I don't believe in it. But I try to be aware of where I fail and I occasionally go to services. I would hate to be a person who didn't have a spiritual side because there's nothing to nourish you in life apart from retail therapy.

Elsewhere, he has described his practice of Zen meditation.

Jeremy Irons owns Kilcoe Castle near Ballydehob, County Cork, Ireland, and had the castle painted a traditional ochre colour which was misreported as being "pink". He also has another Irish residence in The Liberties of Dublin, as well as a home in his birth town of Cowes, a detached house and barn in Watlington, Oxfordshire and a mews house in Notting Hill, London.

In 2016, in an interview on the BBC Radio 4 Today programme, Irons stated that he would decline an honour: "I became an actor to be a rogue and a vagabond so I don't think it would be apt for the establishment to pull me in as one of their own, for I ain't."

In 2013, Irons said he was a smoker and an avid fan of cigars, naming Romeo y Julieta as his favourite brand. He said, "My curse is that I'm a cigarette smoker. I make my own cigarettes. So I have a tendency to inhale when I smoke a cigar. I have to keep reminding myself not to."

In 2025, Irons' Kilcoe Castle appeared as a single subject in a series of poems (one of them regarding Judi Dench) printed by the magazine Origami Poems Project and illustrated by the work of Brazilian photographer Sebastião Salgado. The Kilcoe poem described the castle's interior as, "...dreamily decorated impeccably adorned."

== Philanthropy ==
He is the Patron of the Emergency Response Team Search and Rescue (ERTSAR), which is a United Nations–recognised life saving disaster response search and rescue team and registered charity. It is based in his home County of Oxfordshire, England. He supports several other charities, including The Prison Phoenix Trust in England, and the London-based Evidence for Development, which seeks to improve the lives of the world's most needy people by preventing famines and delivering food aid, for both of which he is an active patron. In 2000, Irons received the Golden Plate Award of the American Academy of Achievement presented by Awards Council member Olivia de Havilland during the International Achievement Summit in London.

In 2010, Irons starred in a promotional video, for "The 1billionhungry project" – a worldwide drive to attract at least one million signatures to a petition calling on international leaders to move hunger to the top of the political agenda.

Irons was named Goodwill Ambassador of the Food and Agriculture Organization of the United Nations in 2011. He provided the narration of the 2013 documentary (by Andrew Lauer) Sahaya Going Beyond about the work of the charity Sahaya International.

In November 2015, Irons supported the No Cold Homes campaign by the UK charity Turn2us. Irons was one of nearly thirty celebrities, who included Helen Mirren, Hugh Laurie and Ed Sheeran, to donate items of winter clothing to the campaign, with the proceeds used to help people in the UK struggling to keep their homes warm in winter.

Irons is a patron of the Chiltern Shakespeare Company, which produces Shakespearean plays annually in Beaconsfield, Buckinghamshire, and a London-based drama school, The Associated Studios. Irons was bestowed an Honorary Life Membership by the University College Dublin Law Society in September 2008, in honour of his contribution to television, film, audio, music, and theatre. Also in 2008, Irons was awarded an honorary Doctorate by Southampton Solent University. On 20 July 2016, Irons was announced as the first Chancellor of Bath Spa University. In December 2024, Jeremy Irons was awarded an Honorary Doctorate of Arts by University College Cork.

== Acting credits and accolades ==
Over his career he has received numerous accolades including nominations for his roles on stage and screen including an Academy Award, an Actor Award, two Golden Globe Awards, three Primetime Emmy Awards, and a Tony Award, as well as nominations for two BAFTA Awards, and Grammy Award. He received the Honorary César in 2002.

On 17 December 2017, he was awarded the XVI Europe Theatre Prize, in Rome. The Prize organization stated, "With Jeremy Irons, life and art have been mixed to the point of creating an inimitable style, as man and actor, which blends an air of freedom with the enviable capacity to enter into the spirit of the most varied productions, in theatre, cinema and television, without ever betraying himself or giving up his independence. In productions great and small, with an unflinching love for his profession, Jeremy Irons says of himself: 'I became an actor to be a rogue and vagabond, so I don't think the establishment would be able to welcome me as one of its own – because I'm not.' His versatility as an actor, as much at ease in Shakespeare as in a hit television series, comes from being part of a profession that he loves and in which he is loved."

== See also ==
- List of British actors
- List of Academy Award winners and nominees from Great Britain
- List of actors with Academy Award nominations
- List of Primetime Emmy Award winners
- List of Golden Globe winners
