= Elmer the Elephant =

Elmer the Elephant may refer to:

- Elmer the Patchwork Elephant, a book series by David McKee first published in the late 1960s
- Elmer Elephant, a 1936 Disney short
- Elmer the Elephant, a 1950s - 1960s TV show from Chicago
- Elmer the Safety Elephant, mascot and icon for Canada Safety Council
