= List of awards and nominations received by Jeremy Irons =

Jeremy Irons awards and nominations
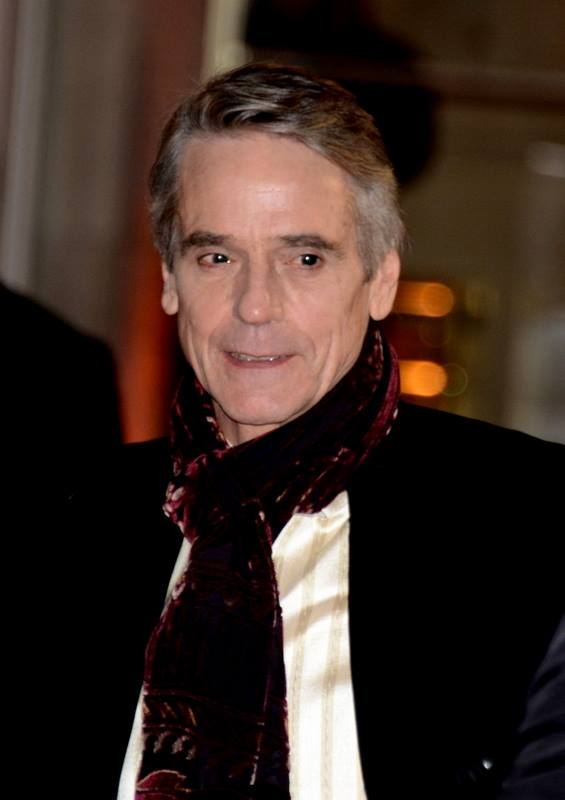
- Irons at the César Awards in 2014
Awards and nominations
Award	Wins	Nominations
Academy Awards	1	1
BAFTA Awards	0	2
Golden Globe Awards	2	6
Grammy Awards	0	1
Primetime Emmy Awards	3	5
Screen Actors Guild Awards	1	4
Tony Awards	1	1

Totals (Note: Certain award groups do not simply award one winner. They acknowledge several different recipients, have runners-up, and have third place. Since this is a specific recognition and is different from losing an award, runner-up mentions are considered wins in this award tally. For simplification and to avoid errors, each award in this list has been presumed to have had a prior nomination.)
- Wins: 16
- Nominations: 40

Jeremy Irons is an English actor known for his diverse roles on stage and screen. Over his distinguished career he has received numerous accolades including an Academy Award, two Golden Globe Awards, three Primetime Emmy Awards, a Screen Actors Guild Award, and a Tony Award, as well as nominations for two BAFTA Awards, and Grammy Award. He received the Honorary César in 2002, and the Europe Theatre Prize in 2017.

He won the Academy Award for Best Actor and the Golden Globe Award for Best Actor in a Motion Picture – Drama for his portrayal of Claus von Bülow in the crime drama Reversal of Fortune (1990). For his dual role of Charles Henry Smithson and Mike in the romantic drama The French Lieutenant's Woman (1981) he was nominated for the BAFTA Award for Best Actor in a Leading Role. He was nominated for the Golden Globe Award for Best Actor in a Motion Picture – Drama for his role as a Jesuit priest in the period epic The Mission (1986).

On television, Irons's break-out role came playing Charles Ryder in the ITV series Brideshead Revisited (1981), receiving nominations for the British Academy Television Award for Best Actor, Primetime Emmy Award for Outstanding Lead Actor in a Limited Series or Movie, Golden Globe Award for Best Actor – Miniseries or Television Film for Best Actor. He received the Primetime Emmy Award for his portrayal of Robert Dudley, 1st Earl of Leicester in the HBO miniseries Elizabeth I (2005) and was Emmy-nominated for playing Adrian Veidt / Ozymandias in HBO's Watchmen (2019).

On stage, he won the Tony Award for Best Actor in a Play for his performance of a man engaging in an affair in the Broadway production of the Tom Stoppard play The Real Thing (1985). The role also earned him a Drama Desk Award nomination.

== Major associations ==
=== Academy Awards ===
Year	Category	Nominated work	Result	Ref.
1991	Best Actor	Reversal of Fortune	Won	

=== BAFTA Awards ===
Year	Category	Nominated work	Result	Ref.
British Academy Film Awards
1981	Best Actor in a Leading Role	The French Lieutenant's Woman	Nominated	
British Academy Television Awards
1982	Best Actor	Brideshead Revisited	Nominated	

=== Emmy Awards ===
Year	Category	Nominated work	Result	Ref.
Primetime Emmy Awards
1982	Outstanding Lead Actor in a Limited Series or a Special	Brideshead Revisited	Nominated	
1997	Outstanding Voice-Over Performance	The Great War and the Shaping of the 20th Century: War Without End	Won	
2006	Outstanding Supporting Actor in a Miniseries or a Movie	Elizabeth I	Won	
2014	Outstanding Narrator	Game of Lions	Won	
2020	Outstanding Lead Actor in a Limited Series or Movie	Watchmen	Nominated	

=== Golden Globe Awards ===
Year	Category	Nominated work	Result	Ref.
1983	Best Actor in a Miniseries or Motion Picture – Television	Brideshead Revisited	Nominated	
1987	Best Actor in a Motion Picture – Drama	The Mission	Nominated	
1991	Best Actor in a Motion Picture – Drama	Reversal of Fortune	Won	
2007	Best Supporting Actor – Television	Elizabeth I	Won	
2010	Best Actor in a Miniseries or Motion Picture – Television	Georgia O'Keeffe	Nominated	
2012	Best Actor in a Television Series – Drama	The Borgias	Nominated	

=== Grammy Awards ===
Year	Category	Nominated work	Result	Ref.
1985	Best Spoken Word Album	The Real Thing (with Glenn Close)	Nominated	

=== Screen Actors Guild Awards ===
Year	Category	Nominated work	Result	Ref.
2007	Outstanding Actor in a Miniseries or Television Movie	Elizabeth I	Won	
2010	Outstanding Actor in a Miniseries or Television Movie	Georgia O'Keeffe	Nominated	
2014	Outstanding Actor in a Miniseries or Television Movie	The Hollow Crown	Nominated	
2022	Outstanding Cast in a Motion Picture	House of Gucci	Nominated	

=== Tony Awards ===
Year	Category	Nominated work	Result	Ref.
1984	Best Actor in a Play	The Real Thing	Won	

== Critics awards ==
Organizations	Year	Category	Work	Result	Ref.
Boston Society of Film Critics	1990	Best Actor	Reversal of Fortune	Won	
Chicago Film Critics Association	1989	Best Actor	Dead Ringers	Won	
Chicago Film Critics Association	1990	Best Actor	Reversal of Fortune	Won	
Kansas City Film Critics Circle	1990	Best Actor	Reversal of Fortune	Won	
Los Angeles Film Critics Association	1990	Best Actor	Reversal of Fortune	Won	
National Society of Film Critics	1991	Best Actor	Reversal of Fortune	Won	
New York Film Critics' Circle	1989	Best Actor	Dead Ringers	Won	
New York Film Critics' Circle	1990	Best Actor	Reversal of Fortune	Nominated	
Phoenix Film Critics Society	2011	Best Ensemble Acting	Margin Call	Nominated	
Central Ohio Film Critics Association	2011	Best Ensemble	Margin Call	Nominated	
Indiana Film Journalists Association	2016	Best Supporting Actor	The Man Who Knew Infinity	Nominated	

== Miscellaneous awards ==
Organizations	Year	Category	Work	Result	Ref.
Annie Award	1994	Best Achievement in Voice Acting	The Lion King	Won	
Drama Desk Award	1984	Outstanding Actor in a Play	The Real Thing	Nominated	
Genie Award	1989	Best Actor in a Leading Role	Dead Ringers	Won	
Gotham Award	2011	Best Ensemble	Margin Call	Nominated	
Independent Spirit Award	2011	Robert Altman Award	Margin Call	Won	
Satellite Awards	1997	Best Actor in a Supporting Role, Drama	Stealing Beauty	Nominated	
Satellite Awards	2005	Best Actor in a Supporting Role, Musical or Comedy	Being Julia	Nominated	
Satellite Awards	2009	Best Actor in a Miniseries or Movie	Georgia O'Keeffe	Nominated	
Saturn Award	1990	Best Actor	Dead Ringers	Nominated	

== Honorary awards ==
Organizations	Year	Notes	Result	Ref.
Clarence Derwent Awards	1979	Statue	Honored	
San Sebastian International Film Festival	1997	Statue	Honored	
European Film Award	1998	Statue	Honored	
Honorary César	2002	Statue	Honored	
Europe Theatre Prize	2017	Statue	Honored	

== See also ==
- Jeremy Irons on stage and screen
- List of British actors
- List of Academy Award winners and nominees from Great Britain
- List of actors with Academy Award nominations
- List of Primetime Emmy Award winners
- List of Golden Globe winners
