= Encephalartos dyerianus =

Conservation status
- Critically Endangered (IUCN 3.1)
- CITES Appendix I (CITES)

Scientific classification
- Kingdom: Plantae
- Clade: Tracheophytes
- Clade: Gymnospermae
- Division: Cycadophyta
- Class: Cycadopsida
- Order: Cycadales
- Family: Zamiaceae
- Genus: Encephalartos
- Species: E. dyerianus

Binomial name
- Encephalartos dyerianus Lavranos & D.L.Goode

Species of cycad

Encephalartos dyerianus, known colloquially as the Lillie cycad, is a species of cycad that is native to hillsides in the lowveld of eastern Limpopo, South Africa.

== Description ==
This cycad's stem grows up to 4 m tall and 60 cm wide. Its leaves are 140–170 cm long, blue-silver, slightly inclined, with straight petioles containing up to six spines. Leaflets are 17–24 cm long, 13–18 mm wide, toothed, and form angles of 45-80° with the leaf. Near the base, leaflets turn into thorns. The spine is typically straight but can be slightly twisted. This species is dioecious, with male cones 30–50 cm long, 9–12 cm in diameter, and blue-green or yellow; female cones are 30–60 cm long, 10–20 cm in diameter, and also blue-green or yellow. Seeds are elongated, 40–45 mm long, 25–30 mm wide, with a yellow or orange-brown sarcotesta.

== Range and habitat ==
It is native to the lowveld of eastern Limpopo. It occurs on slopes of low granite hills in the Gravelotte Rocky Bushveld, in either open grassland or shrubland.

== Status ==
It is listed under CITES Appendix I, which implies that it is "most endangered" in its natural range. Some 600 plants remained in the wild during the 1970s, but this was further reduced during 2008. In addition to illegal collecting, an application for strip mining in Selati Game Reserve is seen as a threat.
