= Great Plains Conservation =

Great Plains Conservation is conservation and tourism organization, which helps to manage several wildlife reserves in Kenya, Botswana, and Zimbabwe. The group currently operates 18 safari camps, which include luxury lodges and tented camps. Great Plains Conservation works together with local governments and community groups to promote low-density, environmentally conscious tourism, supplying economic incentives for the protection of wildlife.

Great Plains Conservation was founded in 2006 by a group of conservationists and filmmakers. Its CEO is Dereck Joubert.

Dereck and Beverly Joubert are National Geographic wildlife filmmakers, behind titles such as Last Lions and Eye of the Leopard. Dereck Joubert is also a National Geographic Explorer at large.

Great Plains Conservation camps
Country:	Camp:
Botswana	Duba Plains Camp
Botswana	Duba Plains Suite
Botswana	Duba Explorers Camp
Botswana	Selinda Camp
Botswana	Selinda Suite
Botswana	Selinda Explorers Camp
Botswana	Zarafa Camp
Botswana	Zarafa Dhow Suite
Botswana	Okavango Explorers Camp
Botswana	Sitatunga Private Island Camp
Botswana	Sitatunga Private Island Suite
Kenya	ol Donyo Lodge
Kenya	Mara Plains Camp
Kenya	Mara Plains Jahazi Suite
Kenya	Mara Nyika Camp
Kenya	Mara Expedition Camp
Kenya	Mara Toto Camp
Zimbabwe	Tembo Plains Camp
Zimbabwe	Mpala Jena Camp
