= Keith Joubert =

Keith Eric Joubert (1948 – 31 January 2013) was a South African artist and conservationist, and elder brother of wildlife filmmaker and conservationist Dereck Joubert.

The Germiston-born Joubert's formative years were spent shuttling between highveld mining communities in the wake of his father, who was a mining surveyor. He attended no fewer than eleven schools, a history that fostered domestic instability but also created a sturdy, resilient character. His family's regular trips to the Kruger National Park sparked an abiding love for the natural world. He studied Industrial Design at the Johannesburg School of Art between 1963 and 1967, thereafter working as a book illustrator, political cartoonist, signwriter, and eventually in the advertising industry, developing the graphic style that subsequently informed his work, and turning professional in 1970.. Keith's family members say he was a loving person and was always willing to help others and put them before himself.

Joubert spent a great deal of his time in the bushveld, finally abandoning city life permanently, and working from a studio in the Selati Game Reserve. Always on the move, Joubert explored Southern Africa, becoming familiar with Namibia, north to the Ivory Coast and Cameroon, Mozambique, East Africa, Botswana, and the Okavango Basin where he had a houseboat and studio camp on the Linyanti River. Joubert's works are to be found in many corporate and private collections worldwide. Believing that possessions complicated his life, he settled for his four-wheel-drive vehicle, tent, and camp bed. He is survived by his wife, Val.

== Links ==
- Home Page
- Everard Read Gallery
