= The Last Lions =

- Film poster
- Directed by: Dereck Joubert
- Narrated by: Jeremy Irons
- Music by: Alex Wurman
- Production company: National Geographic Entertainment
- Distributed by: Virgil Films
- Release date: January 13, 2011 (Palm Springs Film Festival)
- Running time: 88 minutes
- Country: United States
- Language: English

The Last Lions is a 2011 African nature documentary film by National Geographic Society, videotaped and directed by Dereck and Beverly Joubert. It was shot in Botswana's Okavango Delta. The film premiered at the Palm Springs International Film Festival in January 2011 and was released in select theaters the following month on February 18. The film follows in the tradition of other National Geographic big cat films, such as India: Land of the Tiger and Eye of the Leopard.

The film documentary focuses on a lioness named Ma di Tau ("Mother of Lions") as she battles to protect her cubs against the daunting onslaught of enemies to ensure their survival. The underlying message of the film is on the low population of large cats in the world and whether or not Ma di Tau and her cubs are among the last lions. The film is narrated by Jeremy Irons, who voiced Scar in Disney's 1994 animated film The Lion King. Irons also narrated Eye of the Leopard, a 2006 National Geographic film.

Four years earlier, National Geographic released Super Pride, which was narrated by Lance Lewman. Disneynature released African Cats, a similar documentary film in April 2011.

Roar: Lions of the Kalahari, another National Geographic film about lions was released, but later it was re-released as Lions: Roar of the Kalahari and the film was narrated by James Garrett.

== Reception ==
Review aggregation website Rotten Tomatoes reports that 87% of 38 professional critics have given the film a positive review, with a rating average of 7.3 out of 10.
