= Impressionism (play) =

- The artwork for the 2009 production of Impressionism
- Written by: Michael Jacobs
- Characters: Thomas Buckle, Katherine Keenan
- Original language: English

Premiere
- Date premiered: March 24, 2009
- Place premiered: Gerald Schoenfeld Theatre, Broadway
- Official website

Impressionism is a 2009 play by Michael Jacobs about "an international photojournalist and a New York gallery owner whose unexpected brush with intimacy leads them to realize that there is an art to repairing broken lives."

== Plot ==
The setting is the small art gallery of Katharine Keenan, where Thomas Buckle has been employed for the past two years. They use the gallery as a hiding place, to separate themselves from a world which has shattered them. He, by his time as a world traveling photojournalist, and she, by horribly failed relationships. Thomas brings Katharine coffee each morning, and tells her stories of its particular origin, although these stories are actually reflections of his own experiences. These lead to flashbacks of iconic moments that have led to their present state, as well as their relationship to the art that hangs in the gallery, which Katharine will not easily sell. In the end, we journey through a love story which shows Katharine and Thomas, that just like the Impressionist art on the walls, the more they step away from the canvas of their lives up to now, the more they realize that their future together might hold more depth than the past that has led them to each other.

== Production history ==
Directed by Jack O'Brien with original music by Bob James, the play starred Joan Allen, Jeremy Irons, André DeShields, Hadley Delany, Aaron Lazar, Margarita Levieva, Marsha Mason, and Michael T. Weiss. The Broadway premiere began previews at the Gerald Schoenfeld Theatre on February 28, 2009. Its original official opening of March 12 was later postponed to March 24, because the producer, Bill Haber, director, Jack O'Brien, and writer, Michael Jacobs believed that, as this was the show's world premiere, more previews were necessary to gauge audience reaction to particular shifts in time and place, which were part of the story. As producer Bill Haber said, "We did not give Jack O'Brien and our extraordinary creative team and company enough time to fully prepare Michael Jacobs's new play for Broadway. Impressionism is a world premiere on Broadway, which has not been work-shopped or played out of town. We are working hard in previews and we need more time to get the show finished for the official opening." The team took the time to sculpt the play back to what the original script had called for, and the intermission, which was added in rehearsal, was eliminated.

The play met with mixed reviews by the critics. Ben Brantley of The New York Times was negative, calling it "undernourished" and its stars "ill-used". Entertainment Weekly, however, gave the play a B and wrote that, "[Impressionism] practices the art of romantic comedy with a nice mix of pathos, intellect, and wit". The New Yorker was enthusiastic and thought the play "is as awkward as it is sublime", noting its "brazen sweetness" and "openhearted humor".
