= Trashed (film) =

- Directed by: Candida Brady
- Written by: Candida Brady
- Produced by: Candida Brady; Titus Ogilvy
- Starring: Jeremy Irons
- Cinematography: Sean Bobbitt
- Edited by: James Coward, Jamie Trevill, Kate Coggins
- Music by: Vangelis
- Production company: Blenheim Films
- Release dates: May 22, 2012; (Cannes); December 14, 2012 (United States)
- Running time: 97 minutes
- Language: English

Trashed is an environmental documentary film, written and directed by British film-maker Candida Brady. It follows actor Jeremy Irons as he investigates the global scale and impact of humanity's modern wasteful consumerism and pollution. The film is a call for urgent action to resolve the issue of existing deposits and drastically reduce our consumption towards sustainable levels and zero waste, but also demonstrates how this is already being achieved successfully in many communities around the world.

The film premiered at the Cannes Film Festival on May 22, 2012, where it was nominated for the Camera d'Or. In the United States it was released on December 14, 2012, and the United Kingdom and other countries the following year.

== Plot ==
With the participation of Jeremy Irons, the documentary looks at the risks to the food chain and the environment through pollution of our air, land and sea by waste. The film reveals surprising truths about very immediate and potent dangers to human health. It is a global conversation between the film star Jeremy Irons and scientists, politicians and ordinary individuals whose health and livelihoods have been fundamentally affected by waste pollution. It shows how the risks to our survival can easily be averted through sustainable approaches that provide far more employment than the current waste industry. Many sites were visited and filmed, around 11 cities, including:

- Sidon in Lebanon; the 40 metre mountain of household rubbish in the city port which is affecting the Eastern Mediterranean.
- Yorkshire and Gloucestershire in England; the massive toxic waste mounds, near a school and a future hospital as well as housing. Recent research showed that the clay used under liners, designed to prevent contamination of ground water, actually enhances the leaching process.
- Ísafjörður in Iceland; the garbage incinerator Funi (among many in the world like those of Covanta Energy) had filters which stopped working, releasing highly toxic dioxin gas up to 20 times over the safe limit. According to Irons, it "showed me how state agencies can so easily be seduced by experts who promise to make their problems go away, but who become conspicuously absent when their promises do not deliver".
- Grignon and Gilly-sur-Isère near Albertville in the Auvergne-Rhône-Alpes; the Gilly incinerator was closed following a series of catastrophic dioxin emission readings which caused a scandalous occurrence of cancer among the inhabitants, and their subsequent court fight for justice.
- Từ Dũ hospital of Obstetrics and Gynecology in Ho Chi Minh City in Vietnam; health impact of Agent Orange (TCDD), which was used by the U.S. military during the Vietnam War, on the people of Vietnam including the impact of toxic chemicals on reproductive outcomes, dioxin induced risk to pregnancies, and women giving birth to grossly deformed babies. It showed the result of large quantities of dioxin on humans.
- Wales coastline; action of cleaning the garbage from the sea coast.
- Jakarta and Ciliwung river in Indonesia; by the highly polluted river live the numerous poor of society.
- Gulf of California; an interview with Charles J. Moore about the Great Pacific Garbage Patch of plastic, chemical sludge (chemicals like flame retardants, pesticides, herbicides, dioxins among other are often hydrophobic and thus are attracted by the plastic) and other waste which are affecting the sea life, and by the food chain the humans.
- Plymouth in England; the microparticles of plastic are affecting shellfish.
- Great Cumbrae in Scotland; the microparticles of plastic are affecting crabs, and shrimp (up to 83%).
- London Zoo in England; interview with Paul D. Jepson about the biomagnification of the toxins among the sea mammals, for example the Beluga whales at the Saint Lawrence Seaway between Canada and United States.
- Ross-on-Wye and London in England; organic stores which raise the issue of food packaging, as well British prison which successfully treats food waste.
- San Francisco; it reached 75% diversion or zero waste in 2012, compared to New York City which creates 1.5% of total global waste, while recycling only 11-18% of it in 2012, as well that waste reduction and recycling is "ideally suited to the creation of a new and forward-thinking industry that could be profitable and create new jobs".

== Production ==
It was produced by Blenheim Films and released by First Pond Entertainment (USA). Candida Brady wrote, directed and co-produced (along Titus Ogilvy) the film. Jeremy Irons, Rose Ganguzza and Tom Wesel worked as executive producers, while Tabitha Troughton as associate producer. Garry Waller worked as art director, while Sean Bobbitt was the cinematographer. Brady and Irons discussed various possible topics, and decided on the problem of waste, because "despite all the evidence and research available, it is not being seriously faced". Irons helped to raise the finance and persuaded his friend Vangelis to score the music.

The director Candida Brady notes they tried to address potential backlash "by putting all the science together in one place ... we've got 84 peer-reviewed published studies, so that you couldn't dispute it. I think a lot of the problems that films have had in the past were things that don't stand up when you look a little further". To her the most disturbing study was about umbilical cord blood (2009), which "found up to 232 man-made industrial compounds and pollutants present in a child before it is even born. Ten out of ten babies were shown to have chlorinated dioxins in their blood". Other influential studies and interviews include Dr. Ana Soto (who has researched Bisphenol A in plastic) who "explained that toxic chemicals are afforded the same rights as human beings: innocent until proven guilty", and Paul Jepson's work at ZSL about the effect of toxic chemicals on cetaceans in the world's seas and oceans for 20 years, finding out that the killer whales are no longer able to reproduce as they carry the biggest toxic burden.

It took Brady over two years of research, during which she felt various emotions as she became too close to the subject. She notes that "what did become very clear to me, is that it is such a complicated subject, waste almost needs its own worldwide regulatory body because it is too much for most people, and they will have knowledge of one area but not another". They persistently tried to interact with the individuals "on the other side of the issue", but were met with reluctance. In the beginning she wanted to have a "bad guy" to blame, but soon it became very clear that the issue is so complicated, there is not one person or company, yet the whole of humanity's way of life has got out of control.

However, compared to many other environmental documentaries it is very critical of the incinerations and waste-to-energy plants, because it is related to the "issue of dioxin pollution – a by-product of incineration, which in high doses can cause a range of health problems including cancer, reproductive difficulties and birth defects", and it is not a long-term solution to resolve the issue of global waste production, compared to zero waste approach. The dioxin builds up in the fat of the body, and women are "luckier" to get rid of it - when women become pregnant some of the dioxin, along other nutrients, goes to the fetus.

According to Irons, the director Brady decided to show the footage of jars containing preserved foetuses with birth defects in a hospital in Vietnam because of two reasons; to most people the dioxins, furans, PCBs and other toxic chemicals are all just words, until they see and understand their impact in the human body and on life in general. Secondly as a 2001 BBC Newsnight investigation found that ash from a London incinerator had a similar level of dioxins to Vietnamese soil, after the spraying of Agent Orange. Most incinerator filters are globally only checked between two and four times annually for a few hours at a time, and in the past medical research was generally interested only into the effects of high dosage, whereas recently they have discovered evidence that dioxins are having an effect on foetuses at very, very low doses. It is thought that it could take six generations to "breed out" genetic damage.

== Release ==
The film premiered at the Cannes Film Festival on 22 May 2012. In the United States it was released on 14 December 2012. Between 8 April and 7 November 2013, it was released in the United Kingdom, Italy, Russia, Japan and Germany. On 16 November 2016, it will be released in France. It was released on DVD, iTunes Store, it can also be bought and rented online from the official website.

== Reception ==
Trashed has received universal positive acclaim by critics. Film review aggregator Rotten Tomatoes reports 87% of critics gave the film a "Fresh" rating, based on 15 reviews with an average score of 7/10. Metacritic, another review aggregator, assigned the film a weighted average score of 71 (out of 100) based on 6 reviews from mainstream critics, considered to be "generally favorable reviews".

In 2021 The Big Issue looked at some of the vital climate films shocking people into action in a round up entitled Environmental Documentaries We All Need to See, concluding about Trashed "Have the warnings been heeded? No they have not, meaning Irons’ film is almost a decade more vital and urgent now than when it was made."

In The New York Times the review notes "if we must talk trash, Mr. Irons — assisted by a scientist or two and Vangelis's doomy score — is an inspired choice of guide", and by the time of the visit to the Vietnamese hospital for children, the "plastic water bottle in your hand will feel as dangerous as a Molotov cocktail". In the New York Daily News review the film received 5/5 stars; the review concluded that "for all the poisonous truths in Trashed, there are also solid grass-roots solutions that, as presented, feel do-able and politically digestible. That helps, because everything Irons finds puts you off food. Crucial viewing for realists and alarmists both". The Huffington Post concluded with the reviewer's challenge for "any decent human being to see it from start to finish and still think that garbage should be fooled around with in such close proximity to children".

The Village Voice noted that "forcing our attention onto the thing most of us love to forget makes its own point. And indeed it is hard to look at the dumps, heaps, toxic seepages, and ocean-polluting plastics shown here to be neither as distant nor as containable as one might hope". The Variety review concluded that "the pic delivers a judicious mix of human interest and useful statistics that will make it accessible to middle-class auds, especially at green-tinged fests and on upscale broadcasters".

The Hollywood Reporter's review considered that the Irons mission placed "him closer to, say, Nick Broomfield", "Brady's script has a playschool-simple four-part structure, examining the three main methods of trash-disposal -- landfill, incineration and sea-dumping", while "digital cinematography by Sean Bobbitt present a range of disturbing images with unblinking clarity -- and eventually any grounds for optimism become dispiritingly elusive". However, it "doesn't present itself as a rounded exploration of the issues it analyzes", with "anyone who disagrees with its basic theses are non-existent, and we never really get to the bottom of who's to blame". In the Los Angeles Times is also noted that although "scientists, doctors and academics weigh in as well, though flipside input from corporate interests and government policymakers would have added welcome dimension to this crucial discussion". The Empire review gave the film 3/5 stars, considering that "despite offering some sensible solutions, the scale and style are too small-screen for mass conversion".

The Sabotage Times review concluded that "Trashed is a documentary that needs to be seen, that needs to enter the mainstream. Because we're (still) trashing the planet. We've heard this enough to stop thinking about the implications, to start humming to what's become white noise - but Trashed rearticulates the message, volunteering a not just inconvenient but downright harrowing set of truths".

=== Awards ===
In 2012, it won the "Special Jury Prize" in the "Earth Grand Prix" category at the Tokyo International Film Festival, "Audience Award - Movies that Matter" at the Maui Film Festival, and was nominated for the best international film award at the Planet in Focus Film Festival and the Caméra d'Or at the Cannes Film Festival. The film was an official selection of the Espoo Ciné International Film Festival, the Rio de Janeiro International Film Festival and the Abu Dhabi Film Festival. It was also in competition at the 20th annual Raindance Film Festival and had a special screening at the 18th Sarajevo Film Festival.

In 2013, it won the "Special Documentary Award" at the 30th International Environmental Film Festival (FIFE) held in Paris, "Grand Prix Winner" at the Kyiv International Documentary Film Festival, "Palme Verte" at the UK Green Film Festival, "Award of Excellence" and "Best Editing" at the movie awards in Los Angeles, and "Special Mention" at the CinemaAmbiente Festival.

In 2014, it won the "Earth Award" at the 5th Cinema Verde Environmental Film and Arts Festival.

In 2018, Trashed won at the Bled International Water Festival.

== Impact ==
Irons noted that the "state and federal government should provide legislation which designs a waste management policy right across the country ... that most people would like to cooperate in reducing waste, but to encourage them the national policy should be clear, well advertised and consistent". Asked what people should do he advised them to research if there is waste-to-energy plant planned in their area and oppose it, while if there is not to discover how the local policy deals with waste. To lobby MP for legislation to cut waste, regulate the production, particularly of toxic plastics, and packaging. To remove all packaging at the point of purchase, thus pushing the problem towards the manufacturers, as well reducing waste both at home and in their workplace.

The film helped to promote, and was also integrated into, Zero Waste initiatives across the world. For example during the screening in Italy in 2013 it was joined by Zero Waste Italy, ANPAS, municipality Greve in Chianti among others, it promoted the book by Paul Connett, and spread the notice that over 119 Italian municipalities had adopted the Zero Waste program. In 2014, the Italian TV channel Rai 3 made a synthesis about the film. Many people in Singapore decided to join the Zero Waste program after they watched the film.

In 2021, the Big Issue highlighted the continuing urgency of the film's message, saying “Have the warnings been heeded? No they have not, meaning Irons’ film is almost a decade more vital and urgent now than when it was made.”

=== Screenings ===
Since the release it has been shown in over 40 countries, as well as at the UK Houses of Parliament, the Welsh Assembly, the Scottish Parliament, the House of the Oireachtas, the European Parliament, the French National Assembly, the New York Mayor's Office. In November 2013 in Jakarta the film was seen by then Governor and current President of Indonesia, Joko Widodo, and the former President Megawati Sukarnoputri among other policy makers. Earth Hour Communities in 31 Indonesian cities were reached for the screening of the documentary. In 2015, Irons presented the film at the University College Cork in Ireland.

== See also ==
- Ecology
- Urban ecology
- Zero waste
- Waste management
- Environmental justice
- Globalization
