= Thunder: An Elephant's Journey =

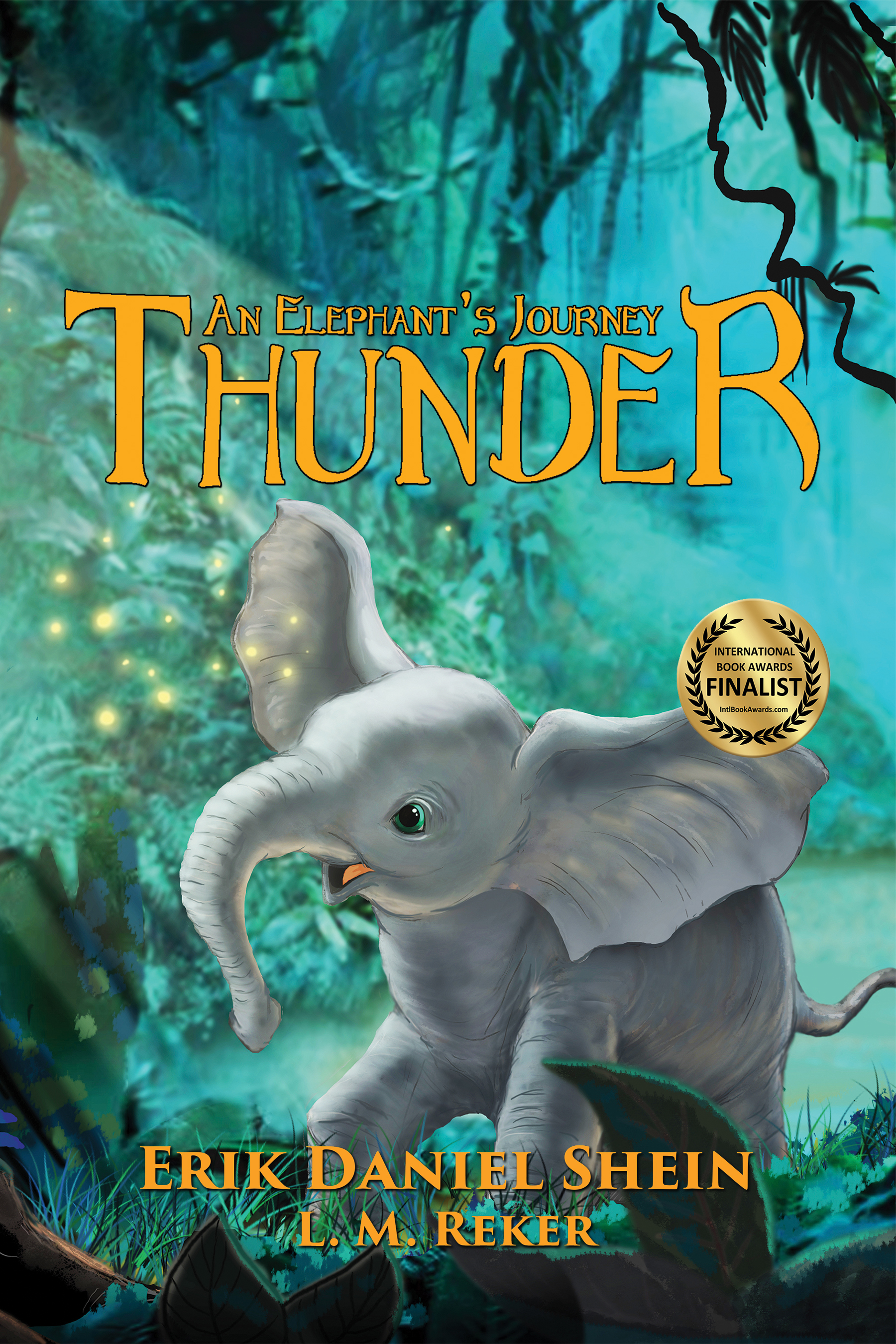
- First edition
- Author: Erik Daniel Shein; L. M. Reker
- Language: English
- Genre: Children's book
- Publisher: World Castle Publishing
- Publication date: 2016
- Publication place: United States
- ISBN: 978-1-62989-564-2

Thunder: An Elephant's Journey is a literary series for children by Erik Daniel Shein and L. M. Reker. It was first published in 2016 by World Castle Publishing. And it was the finalist in 2017 International Book Awards, in the category Children's fiction.

== Summary ==
Thunder, an African pygmy elephant, is the main protagonist of the series, which takes place in Africa alongside his tribe and mother. He is very close to his mother, who teaches him how to communicate and protect himself from the savanna's many dangers, especially Uprights (a term used by the elephants in the story for humans).

Thunder leads a wonderful and happy life while playing with his friends and wandering through the savanna in search of food, until one day, when Drago, a poacher, captures some of his friends and tribe members. However, Thunder and a parrot named Penelope manage to escape. Missing his friends and loved ones a lot, he sets off on a quest to find them, with the help of a rhinoceros named Soma. The story is about how Thunder makes it back to his mother and herd.

== Context and authors ==
The story focuses on the concept of preserving the planet and its species from illegal poaching. The book is a lesson in determination and perseverance for readers of all ages. Published in 2016, it has been reviewed by Kirkus Reviews and Barnes & Noble. The authors of Thunder: An Elephant's Journey are Erik Daniel Shein and L. M. Reker. Erik Daniel Shein is an American writer and entrepreneur born in 1966. He is also a philanthropist and animal health advocate. L. M. Reker is an educator and author based in Phoenix, Arizona. He is also a professor of English.
