= Selati Game Reserve =

South African game reserve

- Location within Limpopo
- Location: Limpopo, South Africa
- Nearest city: Phalaborwa
- Coordinates: 24.004°S 30.685°E
- Area: 30,000 hectares (300 km^{2})
- Website: selatigamereserve.co.za

The Selati Game Reserve is protected wildlife area situated between the towns of Gravelotte and Phalaborwa, in the Limpopo province of South Africa, the reserve has an area of about 30,000 ha.

The most endangered Lillie cycad, listed under CITES Appendix I, occurs in its hills, and an application for strip mining is seen as a threat.

== See also ==
- Protected areas of South Africa
