= Okavango Delta region =

- Subdistrict
- Location in Botswana
- Coordinates: 19°17′45.6″S 22°54′36″E
- Country: Botswana
- District: North-West District (Botswana)

Population (2011)
  - Total: 2,529

Okavango Delta region is one of the subdistricts of Ngamiland District of Botswana.

== Villages ==
- Daonara
- Ditshiping
- Jao
- Katamaga
- Morutsha
- Xaxaba

== Localities ==
- 3rd Bridge
- Abu Camp
- Baine's Camp
- Boat Camp
- Botswana Elephant Training C
- Camp Moremi
- Camp Okavango
- Camp Okuti
- Chiefs Camp
- Chitabe/Chitabe Trials
- Delta Camp
- Dibatana Camp
- Duba Plains Camp
- Eagle Island Camp
- Eden Camp
- Fly-Kujwane Camp
- Footsteps Camp
- Gadingwe 2 Camp
- Gomoti Camp
- Gubenare Camp
- Guma Camp
- Gunn's Camp
- Ivory Camp
- Ivory Fly Camp
- Jacana Camp
- Jao Camp
- Kanana Camp
- Kaporota Camp
- Kiri Camp
- Kubu Camp
- Kubu Fly Camp
- Kujwana Lediba
- Kujwane Camp
- Kwara Camp
- Kwetsane Camp
- Lion Research Camp
- Little Kwara Camp
- Little Vumbura Camp
- Livingstone Camp
- Macatee Camp
- Macatoo Camp
- Makwena Camp
- Mantis Camp
- Matsibe
- Mmapula Lodge
- Mombo Camp
- Moremi Safaris
- Motswiri Camp
- Nxabega Camp
- Oddballs Camp
- Pompom Research Camp
- Pompon Camp
- Qomoqao
- Qorokwe Camp
- Ranns Camp
- Sandibe Camp
- Santantadibe Camp
- Selby's Camp
- Semetsi and Bush Camp
- Seokgwe BDF Camp
- Shindi Camp
- Stanley's Camp
- Thabazimbi
- Thapagadi Camp
- Tubutree Camp
- Vumbura Camp
- Vundumxiki Camp
- Water Affairs Camp
- Wildlife Camp
- Xakanaka Wildlife Camp
- Xigera Camp
- Xudum Camp
- Xugana Camp
