= Elmer the Elephant (TV series) =

American children's television series (1951–1964)

Elmer the Elephant is an American children's television series broadcast by WNBQ-Ch.5. It aired from 5:00 to 5:30 on weekday afternoons from 1951 to 1956. John Conrad stars in and created Elmer the Elephant. The show was canceled in 1956, but then returned from 1962 to 1964, with the same format. Conrad noted that "if you've got a winning formula, why mess with it?".

In 1954, Elmer the Elephant won the Chicago Award for Best Children's Show from TV Guide.

== Content ==
Hosted by John Conrad, Elmer the Elephant, commanded the attention of children of Chicago. Elmer was a mischievous, speechless puppet performed by stagehand Kenny Hermann. Elmer would make children laugh as John would take a pie to the face, be hit with flour, or be pranked by Elmer. For a short period, a female elephant Elmira was also featured, but did not have the popularity of Elmer so was eventually dropped. Conrad would also play short films on the show, including Our Gang and host visiting guests such as Roy Rogers.

The puppet itself was crafted from papier-mâché by prop-man Emil von Knauf, and featured a trunk-like sleeve into which Hermann would place his right arm.

== John Conrad ==
John Conrad, the host and creator of Elmer the Elephant, was born in 1919. After his services in the Navy after World War II, Conrad came to Chicago and became a staff announcer at WMAQ radio (later WMAQ television). Some of his colleagues include Hugh Downs and Dave Garroway. Conrad is best remembered as the host of the Elmer the Elephant show.

In the mid-1960s, Conrad hosted a radio disk-jockey show called John Conrad and Max. Max was a fictitious studio turntable operator who made all sorts of trouble for Conrad, similar to Elmer the Elephant before. Conrad retired from broadcasting in 1968, and them moved to southern California to pursue other business interests.

Conrad died aged 86 on February 7, 2006, in Westlake Village, California.

== Episodes ==
Episode Name	Host
"John's New Coat"	John Conrad
"Hypnotizing Elmer"	John Conrad
"Posting Signs"	John Conrad

== Historical relevance ==
Despite its popularity, Elmer the Elephant was canceled in 1956, as NBC moved away from afternoon children's television. The replacement for the afternoon slot had poor ratings, which further slumped. The show was re-commissioned in 1962, and eventually was filmed in color, but was finally cancelled in 1964.
