= Life on Fire =

- Le Peuple des Volcans
- Genre: Nature documentary television series
- Directed by: Jacques Bedel; Bertrand Loyer; François de Riberolles
- Narrated by: Jacques Gamblin
- Country of origin: France
- Original language: French
- No. of seasons: 1
- No. of episodes: 6

Production
- Running time: 52 minutes per episode
- Production company: Saint Thomas Productions

Life on Fire is a six-part television documentary series, created in 2009–12, about volcanoes. It was directed by Bertrand Loyer, Jacques Bedel, and François de Riberolles and was produced by Saint Thomas Productions of Marseille between 2009 and 2012. It was narrated by Jacques Gamblin. The series was first broadcast in France as Le Peuple des Volcans, and had its American première on PBS on 2 January 2013.

== Episodes ==
Ash Runners

Animals in New Britain have adapted to live with the activity of the local volcano near the city of Rabaul. Directed by Bertrand Loyer and released in France on 18 March 2010. Original title: Les Vagabonds des Cendres. PBS first broadcast date: 30 January 2013.

Pioneers of the Deep

In the Tongan archipelago, the sooty tern and the Alvin shrimp cope when an underwater volcano becomes an island. Directed by Bertrand Loyer and released in France on 23 October 2010. Original title: Naissance d'Une Ile. PBS first broadcast date: 6 February 2013.

The Surprise Salmon

Volcanic activity in Alaska 2,000 years ago disrupted the spawning journey of sockeye salmon, leading them to Surprise Lake in the caldera of Mount Aniakchak. Directed by Bertrand Loyer and released in France on 31 May 2012. Original title: "Les Saumons Surprise" aka Les Saumons du Lac Surprise. PBS first broadcast date: 16 January 2013.

Phoenix Temple

Nature and humans struggle to survive and thrive between eruptions of the Masaya Volcano in Nicaragua, and to rise again like the phoenix. Directed by François de Riberolles and released in France on 30 May 2012. Original title: Le Temple des Phénix. PBS first broadcast date: 23 January 2013.

Volcano Doctors

Volcanologists use their research, insights, and tools to try to protect people living near volcanoes around the world. Directed by François de Riberolles and Bertrand Loyer. Released in France on 21 July 2010. Original title: Trappeurs de Volcans. PBS first broadcast date: 9 January 2013.

Icelandic Volcanoes, Who is Next?

Future volcanic eruptions in Iceland will affect Europe and North America. Directed by Jacques Bedel and François de Riberolles. Television première in France on 26 March 2011. Original title: Volcans d'Islande, et Demain? PBS first broadcast date: 2 January 2013.

== International Awards ==
The series has won more than 20 awards in international film festivals. In particular, wildlife episodes have been acclaimed for their cinematography, sound and storylines. With their 5.1 surround sound and dramatic structures, the stand-alone episodes of "Life on Fire" contrast with those from other wildlife TV series, which are usually delivered in stereo and structured like catalogues - with a succession of sequences guided by a seasonal or geographical theme ("Spring", "Abyss", etc...).

Selected awards :

Ash Runners: Best Sound in UK, Wildscreen 2010 and Wildtalk Africa 2010, Best Cinematography in Russia, St Petersbourg World of Knowledge 2012, Grand Prize in Belgium, Namur Nature Film Festival

Pioneers of the Deep: Best Script and Special Jury Award, in France, Albert Nature Film Festival, France, Grand Prix in France, Menigoute Bird Film Festival, Silver Palm in France, Marseille International Underwater Film Festival

The Surprise salmon: Best Marine Animal Behavior, USA, CA, Monterey, Gold Palm in France, Marseille International Underwater Film Festival, Best Script and Best Sound in France, Albert Nature Film Festival

Phoenix temple: Grand Prix and Best Cinematography, Albert Nature Film Festival, Grand Prix in Italy, Cogne, Gran Paradiso Nature Film Festival.

== Cinematography and Archives ==
Cinematographers have been using innovative techniques seen in other wildlife series, such as Cineflex or Phantom cameras. But they also developed some special artisanal tools, as revealed by some behind the scenes clips on the US or French Home Video editions.

The series has not used any archive material. Most of the images have been captured in 4K and 5K formats, using RED One and Epic Digital Cameras, and down-converted to HD. By producing the series in such format, Saint Thomas Productions claims to own the largest HD stock footage library of volcanoes, displayed on a dedicated website.

== Sequels ==
No sequel of this series has been produced. However, Saint Thomas Productions has produced a 90 minutes special episode, named "A Volcano Odyssey". It premiered on Arte in 2012 under the name Memoires de Volcans and achieved the channel best rating in 2012 for their prime time Sunday strand.
