= The Great War and the Shaping of the 20th Century =

Television documentary series

The Great War and the Shaping of the 20th Century is a 1996 documentary series that aired on PBS. It chronicles World War I over eight episodes. It was narrated by Salome Jens. In the UK, the programme was renamed 1914-18 and was narrated by Dame Judi Dench.

The series won two Primetime Emmy Awards: one for Jeremy Irons for Outstanding Voice-Over Performance, the other for Outstanding Informational Series. It was funded in part by the National Endowment for the Humanities. In 1997, it was given a Peabody Award.

== Production ==
The documentary series was produced by KCET/Los Angeles along with the BBC and the Imperial War Museum in London. It took five years to make and cost five million dollars. Blaine Baggett was the executive producer and Jay Winter was the chief historian. It aired in the United States on PBS in November 1996.

In contrast to the 1964 BBC production titled The Great War, which focused primarily on the military and political aspects of the war, this 1996 documentary, in keeping with more recent trends in historiography, used a wide variety of types of sources to cover social, cultural, economic and personal perspectives on the war in addition to the military and political.

== Voice cast ==
- Jürgen Prochnow as Kaiser Wilhelm II
- Martin Landau as Woodrow Wilson
- Malcolm McDowell as Charles Stockwell
- Ian Richardson as David Lloyd George
- René Auberjonois as Jean Jaurès
- Paul Mercurio as Cyril Lawrence
- Liam Neeson as Adolf Hitler
- Ralph Fiennes as Wilfred Owen
- Michael York as Harold Owen
- Jeremy Irons as Siegfried Sassoon
- Natasha Richardson as Vera Brittain
- Louis Gossett Jr. as W. E. B. Du Bois
- Jane Leeves as Caroline Webb
- Marion Ross as Käthe Kollwitz
- Nastassja Kinski as Rosa Luxemburg
- Martin Sheen as Frank Golder
- Udo Kier as Armin T. Wegner
- Yaphet Kotto as Kaphe Kamar
- Ned Beatty as Herbert Hoover
- Timothy Bottoms as Silver Parrish
- Helen Mirren as Margaret Randa
- Rupert Graves
- Elya Baskin as Yakov Yurovsky
- Leslie Caron as Czarina Aleksandra Romanov

== Episodes ==
1. "Explosion" – Covers the causes of the war, focusing on international tensions resulting from rapid economic, technological, and social changes, as well as how the assassination of Archduke Franz Ferdinand of Austria sparked a continent-wide war.
2. "Stalemate" – Covers the German army’s initial advance through Belgium and France which was stopped at the Battle of the Marne and quickly followed by the armies digging extensive systems of trenches.
3. "Total War" – Examines how the war spread geographically and extended beyond the front lines to civilian populations, including the Turkish massacre of Armenian civilians.
4. "Slaughter" – Focuses on the battles at Verdun, the Somme, and Passchendaele.
5. "Mutiny" – Examines the growing despair on all sides, culminating in revolution in Russia and a mutiny among a large portion of the French army.
6. "Collapse" – Covers the German army’s failed offensive in spring 1918 attempting to end the war before the United States army arrived in large numbers, and the resulting collapse of the German government.
7. "Hatred and Hunger" – Covers the continuing blockade on Germany as the Allies drew up the Treaty of Versailles, with considerable focus on Woodrow Wilson’s role in the Paris Peace Conference.
8. "War Without End" – Examines the cost of the war and its continuing reverberations through the rest of the 20th century.

== Awards ==
The documentary was a critical success and received several awards:

- Two Emmy Awards
- Alfred Du Pont Journalism Award
- George Foster Peabody Award
- Producers Guild of American Vision Award
- International Documentary Association: Best Limited Series Award

== Book ==
A book of the same title, by Blaine Baggett and Jay Winter, was released along with the broadcast of the television series in 1996. Like the television series, the book covers social, cultural, economic and other issues in addition to the political and military aspects of the war. Though the book is a companion to the television series, it is written to stand on its own as a history of the war.
