= Eye of the Leopard =

- Written by: Derek Joubert
- Directed by: Derek Joubert, Beverly Joubert
- Narrated by: Jeremy Irons
- Music by: J.B. Arthur
- Country of origin: United States
- Original language: English

Production
- Producers: Derek Joubert, Beverly Joubert
- Running time: 90 minutes

Original release
- Network: National Geographic Channel
- Release: October 8, 2006

Eye of the Leopard is a 2006 National Geographic documentary directed by Dereck and Beverly Joubert. Set in the Mombo region of the Okavango Delta, Botswana, the film explores the life of a female leopard, Legadema, as she matures from a cub to an adult. Jeremy Irons, voice actor of Scar from Disney's 1994 animation The Lion King, narrates the film. It premiered in the US on the National Geographic Channel on October 8, 2006, and has won many awards including the BBC wildscreen Panda award for Best Sound Wild Screen and an Emmy. Since the success of the film, a book and an app of the same title have been released.

== Synopsis ==
The film follows the journey of leopardess Legadema over the course of three years. Unlike the standard nature documentary, Eye of the Leopard pieces together a series of flashbacks, covering the major events from her childhood all the way to adulthood^{[2]}. These flashbacks reveal her experiences of near-escapes from predators as well as her observations of her mother's hunting skills. Ultimately, each memory shapes her own present-day hunting and survival skills.

At 8 days

Legadema, meaning "light of the sky" in Setswana, is introduced as an eight-day-old cub with a distinctive birthmark feature. There is a small round spot between her two solid whisker lines, referred to in the documentary as a "whisker spot." This mark distinguishes her from the other leopards in the film, including her mother and father. Legadema is the sole survivor of six other cubs. As a young cub, she is filmed biting her mother's tail and climbing trees. Much of her childhood was about her struggle for survival. Her first encounter with danger is with a pack of hyenas, which her mother fights off. She also has a near-death experience with baboons. This prompts her mother to constantly move dens for safety.

At three months

Legadema explores the environment around her. She has grown considerably larger and is shown playing with frogs and turtles. She watches her mother hunting for monkeys and learns the skill of leaping from trees. Legadema also starts developing hunting skills. Many scenes depict her preying on small animals such as lizards, squirrels, and warthogs. Legadema learns survival strategies from her mother such as moving stealthily and escaping large predators. There is one scene where Legadema's mother evades a pride of lions by performing a 'locking-wrist' which allows her to quickly scale up a tall tree.

At 6 months

In her youth, Legadema continues to play and hunt together with her mother. During piglet season, Legadema's mother hunts for warthogs by going into their hole. Legadema follows her mother's technique. As Legadema begins to mature, she becomes more territorial. There is a brief fight scene where Legadema challenges her own mother, mistaking her for an intruder.

At one and a half years:

Legadema is feeling more confident but she is still under the protection of her mother. In one scene while her mother is away hunting, Legadema approaches a troop of baboons. She kills a baboon mother. While she feeds, she notices a baby baboon clinging on to the dead mother. Instead of killing the baby, Legadema decides to protect it. She even carries the baboon out of harm's way at the approach of a hyena. There are scenes where Legadema plays and cuddles with the baby baboon, displaying her maternal instinct. Legadema is coming of age. In another scene, she steals a kill from her mother. Upon climbing a tree, she accidentally drops the carcass leaving it to the hyenas below. At this stage, her childhood is ending.

At three years old:

Legadema has parted ways with her mother. Completing her last rite of passage to become an adult leopardess, Legadema kills an impala. This is her first significant kill made on her own. Later, Legadema encounters a male leopard which turns out to be her half-brother. She later hears her mother's call in the forest. Following the sound, she sees her mother with two new cubs.

== Cast ==
- Legadema as a curious female leopard. Her name means 'light from the sky or above', named after the lightning in the Mombo region. The film describes her as the deadliest squirrel hunter in the Mombo region.
- Tortilis as the strong-willed mother of Legadema, named after the common Acacia tortilis (also known as umbrella thorns) which thrive in the marshland. She is shown as an expert at hunting for monkeys and warthogs. Later in the film, she gives birth to another two cubs.
- Burnt Ebony as the father of Legadema. He comes from a territory with burnt ebony, south of where Legadema and her mother roams. He is the dominant male leopard in the region and a calculated hunter of buffaloes.

== Production ==
=== Development ===
South-African filmmakers Dereck and Beverly Joubert are a husband-wife duo who have produced over 40 National Geographic films. A large body of their work features big cats, including The Last Lions. The idea for Eye of the Leopard came about after the Jouberts followed a leopard to a fallen tree in Botswana. They found a tiny eight-day-old leopard cub who would later be named Legadema. The Jouberts' aim for the documentary was to arouse the curiosity of audiences, erode ignorance and share the value of wild places. The story was intended to inspire others to appreciate and take care of the planet and wildlife. They hope people can derive relevance and meaning from the natural world.

=== Filming ===
The filming took place in Okavango Delta, Botswana over the course of three years. Because of the remoteness of the site, where the nearest town would take half an hour by flight, the crew members received food deliveries from a bush plane. With no electricity, they had to recharge their camera batteries using solar panels.

Between June 2003 to 2006, the filmmakers tracked the daily life of Legadema. Most of the time, they sat in a truck and shot from a distance of around 50 yards from their subject. They always refrained from interfering with wildlife. According to Daily Bruin, the Jouberts needed to wake up at 4 am every day and follow Legedema's movements until 9 pm.

Six months into filming, Dereck Joubert gave the young leopard cub her name of Legadema, meaning "lightning". It was said that during thunderstorms, Legadema would be frightened by the clapping sounds. While her mother was away hunting, Legedema would take shelter and hide under the film crew's trucks. (abc news). Over the filming period, Beverely Joubert admitted she became attached to the leopardess and felt maternally protective over her. When she saw Legedema was in potential danger, she would take some medicine to calm herself down. Over time, Legedema would come to recognise and greet the Jouberts as trusted companions. Dereck Joubert recalled Legedema sniffing at Beverly's feet and playing with his foot. Dereck also remarked that he felt paternal towards Legedema. When Legedema began to look for a mate, he would tell Beverly the mate was not good enough for Legedema.

=== Themes ===
The film features extensive footage of Botswana's Okavango Delta marshland and its inhabitants. It is a story about survival and looks at the relationships between a leopardess and her environment, a mother and daughter, and predator and prey. It shows the leopards stalking, hunting and killing their prey, but also them being attacked and threatened by predators such as lions, baboons and hyenas.

== Reception ==
As of 2020, according to Rotten Tomatoes, a review aggregation website, the film achieved a score of 88% based on 17 user ratings.

After the film, Legedema became a popular name. She attracted thousands of tourists to the reserve in Mombo, Botswana. The Jouberts have a close association with the Botswana Tourism Board. Together, they work to promote sustainable eco-tourism to preserve Africa's wilderness. They are in charge of two eco-tourism businesses, Wilderness Safaris and the Great Plains Conservation which aim to deliver sustainable practices.

During an Australian promotional tour of Eye of the Leopard, the Jouberts made some comments on the wildlife filmmaking industry. They mentioned how the shrinking budget given to wildlife documentaries leads to the "wham, bam thank you ma'am industry" and too often, the audience is shown the 'money shot' (Sullivan, 2016) or a superficial depiction of the subject. Proper ecological filmmaking (Hjort, 2016) requires time and patience.

In reference to the money shot, Dereck Joubert refers to the tendency of Steve Irwin and his imitators for provoking wild animals. He argues that the entertainment value which underpins that particular style of nature documentaries compromises the accuracy and fair reportage of animal behaviour. Not only is it confronting for wildlife, such an attitude also sets a bad example for how people should interact with animals (Palmer, 2007; Aufderheide, 2007).

After the release of Eye of the Leopard, filmmakers Dereck and Beverly Joubert founded the Big Cats Initiative in 2008 (National Geographic, 2020; Nat Geo, 2012) which funds the conservation of big cats in 28 countries. Their mission is to preserve the future of large cat species globally. Big cats are threatened by habitat destruction and poaching. Over the past 50 years, according to National Geographic and wild cat conservation organization Panthera, leopard numbers have diminished from 750000 to just 50 000 over last 50 years. Most big cat populations have also fallen by 90 percent. Local African communities believe these animals threaten their livestock and livelihood. Dereck Joubert believes that if big cat numbers continue to fall, it will damage both Botswana's eco-tourism industry, which is the nation's second largest industry hiring around 40 percent of their workforce, as well as the ecosystem's health.

== Accolades ==
Awards	Category	Result
BBC Wildscreen award: Panda	Best Sound Wildscreen 2006 (Britain)	Won
BBC Wildscreen award: Panda	Best cinematography Wildscreen (2006)	Nominated
Emmy Award, New York	Best Achievement in Science Technology and Nature 2007 (USA)	Won
Jackson Hole Awards	Best Writing Emmy Awards	Nominated
Jackson Hole Awards	Best Non Fiction Writing (USA)	Nominated
Japanese Wildlife Films Festival Nature Award (Japan)		Won
Jules Verne Film Festival, March 7 (France)	Best Nature Film	Won
Wildscreen award: Panda, Bristol	Best Animal Behaviour October 2008 (Britain)	Won
Golden Ibex Award	Best Nature Film (Italy)	Won
Public Prize 19th Bird and Nature Film Festival, Abbeville, France, 2008		Won
19th Festival International du Film Animalier Albert 2009	Grand Prix	Won
Festival de loiseau et de la nature	Le Prix du Public 2009 (France)	Won

== Home media ==
Eye of the Leopard was first released on DVD on 20 February 2007 in the US. It has also been made available the Wildlife Films on demand service. In September 2009, a book of the same title was published. This is a visual book featuring photographs taken by Derek and Beverly Joubert. In 2016, an interactive Eye of the Leopard app was released on iTunes.

== See also ==
Other similar films include The Last Lions (2011) and The Unlikely Leopard (2012), both narrated by Jeremy Irons.
