= Beverly Joubert =

South African film producer

- Born: 12 January 1957 (age 69); Johannesburg
- Citizenship: South Africa
- Occupations: Film producer, Film director, Wildlife photographer, Conservationist

Beverly Joubert (born 12 January 1957) is a South African-born wildlife photographer, filmmaker, conservationist and National Geographic explorer-at-large.

She has been documenting, researching and exploring Africa for over 40 years with her husband, Dereck Joubert. Together, they have made over 40 films for National Geographic, with a strong focus on iconic species like big cats and elephants. Beverly Joubert's wildlife and landscape photographs have been showcased in a dozen or more National Geographic magazine features, international exhibitions, books and articles.

Joubert is a co-founder of Great Plains Conservation. With lodges and tented camps in Kenya, Botswana and Zimbabwe, the company returns large tracts of land to nature through conservation tourism and community upliftment programs.

== Personal life ==
Joubert was born in Johannesburg, South Africa. She met her husband, Dereck, in high school and the couple married in 1983. They have lived and worked in Botswana for over three decades.

In March 2017, the Jouberts survived a near-fatal Cape buffalo attack at their camp in Botswana's Okavango Delta.

== Film career ==
Joubert and her husband have co-produced over 40 films for National Geographic. During their shoots in remote locations across Africa, she focuses on stills photography and sound recording while her husband operates the camera.

Over the years, the Jouberts’ discoveries in the field have challenged conventional wisdom about some of Africa's top predators. In 1992, the couple completed the documentary that won them international acclaim. It is estimated that Eternal Enemies: Lions and Hyenas has been viewed by more than a billion viewers in 127 countries.

The Jouberts’ films have received significant accolades including Emmys, a Peabody Award and Wildscreen Panda Awards. Their Emmy-winning 2006 film Eye of the Leopard follows the life of a single female leopard from infancy to maturity.

In 2014, the couple received the prestigious Lifetime Achievement Award at the South African Film and Television Awards.

== Photography ==
A keen photographer from a young age, Joubert went on to specialise in African wildlife and landscape photography. Her images have appeared in numerous international exhibitions, National Geographic magazine features, books that she has coauthored with her husband, and thousands of articles.

One of her lion photographs taken in Botswana's Okavango Delta was selected for inclusion in the ‘National Geographic: 50 Greatest Wildlife Photographs’ exhibit at the National Museum of Wildlife Art in Jackson, Wyoming in 2022.

== Conservation work ==
The Jouberts’ passion for conservation led them to establish Great Plains Conservation in 2006. The conservation and tourism organisation operates safari camps in Botswana, Kenya and Zimbabwe, and combines these with conservation initiatives and community projects.

The company's charity arm, Great Plains Foundation, focuses on preserving and protecting landscapes, wildlife and the communities that rely on them.

In 2009, the Jouberts founded the Big Cats Initiative with National Geographic, a long-term effort to halt the decline of big cats in the wild and protect the ecosystems they inhabit. This program has now transitioned to the Great Plains Big Cats Initiative, under the Jouberts’ leadership.

Together with her husband, Joubert is also co-founder of Rhinos Without Borders, an initiative that has moved 87 rhinos from high poaching areas to safety.

In response to the COVID-19 pandemic, the Jouberts established Project Ranger, an emergency intervention to secure the jobs of rangers and front-line conservationists across Africa.
