= Elephant hotel =

The Elephant Hotel is an historic building in Somers, Westchester County, New York.

Elephant hotel may also refer to:

- Elephantine Colossus, Coney Island, Brooklyn, New York
- Lucy the Elephant, Margate City, near Atlantic City, New Jersey
