= Barnum Museum (disambiguation) =

Barnum Museum is a museum in Bridgeport, Connecticut, USA, with a collection related to P. T. Barnum.

Barnum Museum may also refer to:

- Barnum's American Museum, a defunct New York City museum co-owned by Barnum, founded 1841 and destroyed by fire in 1865
- Barnum's New Museum, another defunct New York City museum, opened by Barnum in 1865 and destroyed by fire in 1868
- Barnum Museum of Natural History, a defunct museum at Tufts University, notable for displaying the hide of Jumbo the Elephant
- The Barnum Museum, a 1990 collection of fantasy themed short stories by Steven Millhauser
