= Elephant of the Bastille =

Monument in Paris between 1813 and 1846

Coordinates: 48°51′11″N 2°22′09″E

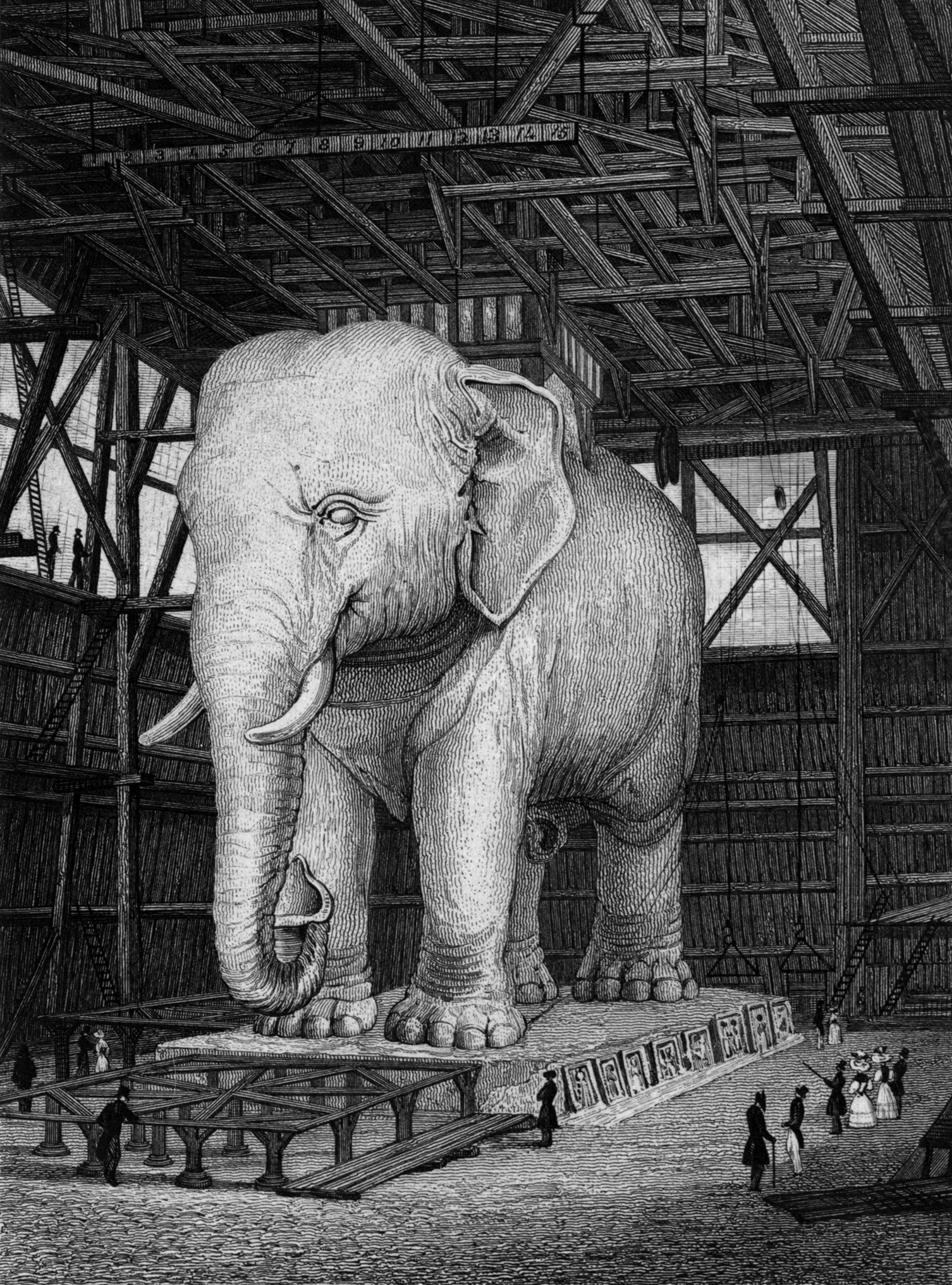
Siderograph (steel engraving) of the plaster full-scale model, by Augustus Welby Northmore Pugin, 1830

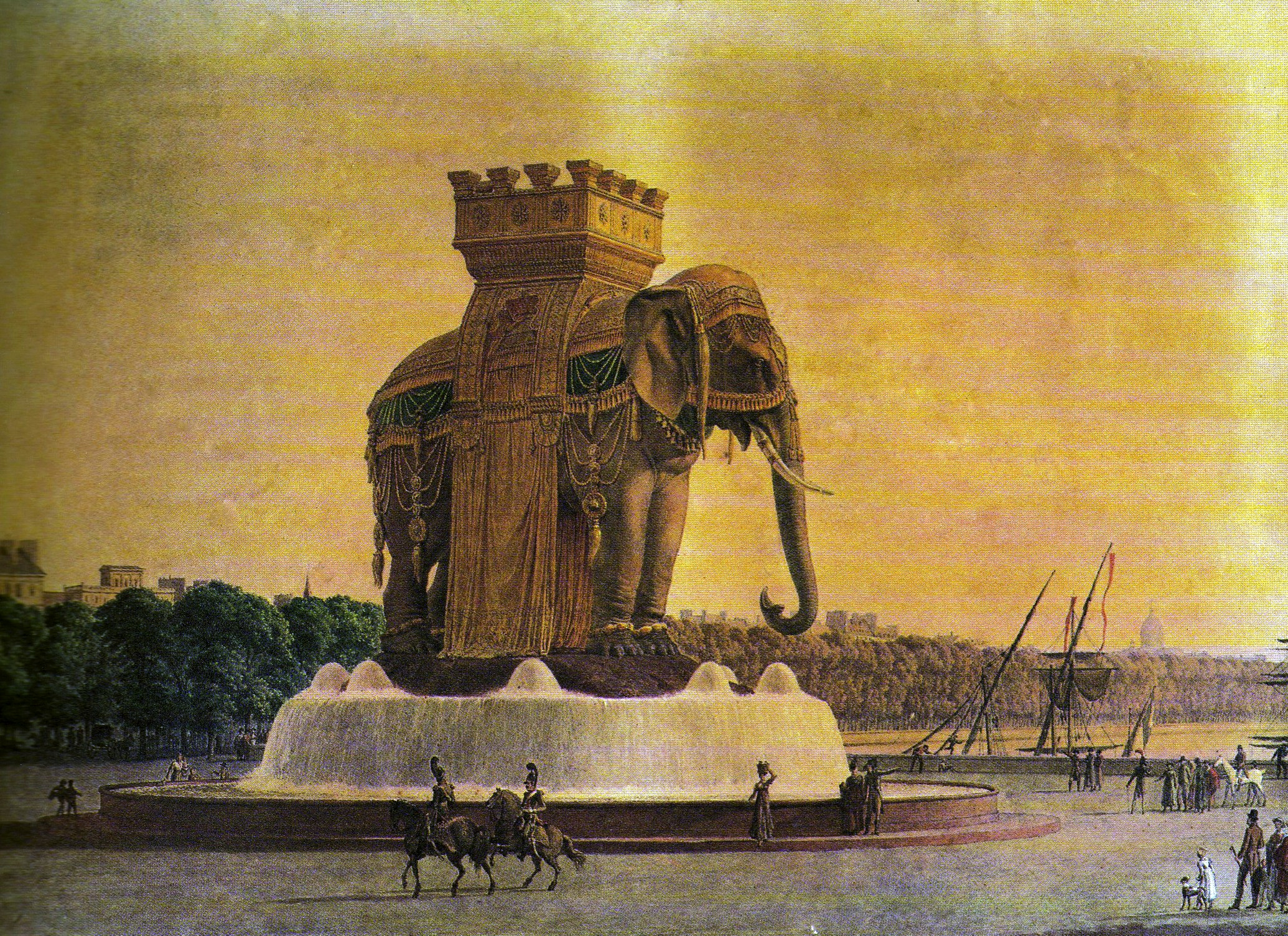
View of the Elephant of the Bastille as it would have appeared in situ

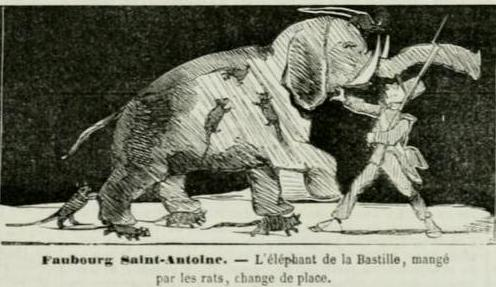
1844 drawing showing rats running around on the statue

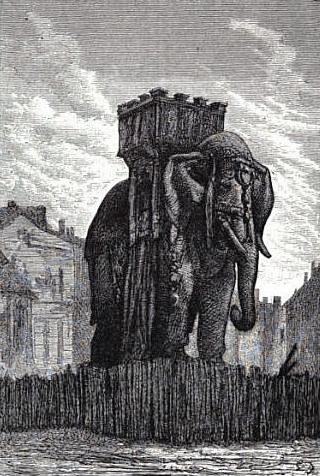
An 1865 illustration by Gustave Brion for Les Misérables

The Elephant of the Bastille (French: Éléphant de la Bastille) was a monument in Paris which existed between 1813 and 1846. Originally conceived in 1808 by Napoleon I, the colossal statue was intended to be created out of bronze and placed in the Place de la Bastille, but only a plaster full-scale model was built. At 24 m (78 ft) in height, the model itself became a recognisable construction and was immortalised by Victor Hugo in his novel Les Misérables (1862) in which it is used as a shelter by the street urchin Gavroche. It was built at the site of the Bastille and, although part of the original construction remains, the elephant itself was replaced a few years later by the July Column (1835–40) constructed on the same spot.

== Conception ==
When the Bastille fell in July 1789, there was some debate as to what should replace it, or indeed if it should remain as a monument to the past. Pierre-François Palloy secured the contract to demolish the building, with the dimension stones being reused for the construction of the Pont de la Concorde and other parts sold by Palloy as souvenirs. Most of the building was removed over the subsequent months by up to 1,000 workers. In 1792 the area was turned into the Place de la Bastille with only traces of the fortress that had once dominated the area remaining.

In 1793, a fountain was built in the square. Known as the "Fountain of Regeneration", it had an Egyptian-inspired design and depicted a woman with water flowing from her breasts.

Napoleon planned many urban regeneration projects for Paris and was particularly fond of monuments to his victories. He wanted to create a significant triumphal structure to demonstrate his military prowess and began the process of designing a 24 m (78 ft) bronze elephant. In the Imperial decree of 24 February 1811, he specified that the colossal bronze elephant be cast from the guns captured at the Battle of Friedland. A stairway would allow visitors to ascend one of the elephant's legs to an observation platform on its back, styled as a howdah.

== Construction ==
Dominique Vivant was given the task of overseeing the project. Initially, Jacques Cellerier was chosen as the architect and work began in 1810 on the ground works, with the vaults and underground pipes completed by 1812. At this point Jean-Antoine Alavoine was chosen to replace him and the main pool was soon completed.

Alavoine, realising the need to show how the finished work would look, recruited Pierre-Charles Bridan to create a full-size model using plaster over a wooden frame. Completed in 1814, the model was protected by a guard named Levasseur who lived in one of the elephant's legs.

The construction work stopped in 1815 after the defeat of Napoleon at the Battle of Waterloo. However, Alavoine was still seeking support to complete the project in 1833 and others also showed interest in finishing Napoleon's ambitious plans. In 1841 and 1843 the city council discussed options to complete the work using bronze, iron or copper, but none of the proposals were accepted.

== Demolition ==
Nearby residents began to complain that rats were inhabiting the elephant and searching for food in their homes; and from the late 1820s, petitioned for demolition. The model elephant was not removed until 1846 by which time it showed considerable wear.

== Legacy ==
The circular basin on which the elephant stood remains to this day and now supports the socle of the July Column.

The elephant itself was described negatively by Victor Hugo in Les Misérables; little other account of contemporary public perception is available.

It was falling into ruins; every season the plaster which detached itself from its sides formed hideous wounds upon it. "The aediles", as the expression ran in elegant dialect, had forgotten it ever since 1814. There it stood in its corner, melancholy, sick, crumbling, surrounded by a rotten palisade, soiled continually by drunken coachmen; cracks meandered athwart its belly, a lath projected from its tail, tall grass flourished between its legs; and, as the level of the place had been rising all around it for a space of thirty years, by that slow and continuous movement which insensibly elevates the soil of large towns, it stood in a hollow, and it looked as though the ground were giving way beneath it. It was unclean, despised, repulsive, and superb, ugly in the eyes of the bourgeois, melancholy in the eyes of the thinker.

— Victor Hugo, Les Misérables, 1862

In April 2012 a smaller replica of the elephant was built in Greenwich as part of the set of the 2012 film version of the musical Les Misérables.

Simon Schama, in the first chapter of Citizens: A Chronicle of the French Revolution (1989), tells the story of the Elephant of the Bastille, which he uses as a symbol of the failed hopes of the French Revolution.

The elephant is a recurring Parisian landmark in Bernard Cornwell's novel Sharpe's Assassin (2021).

== Gallery ==
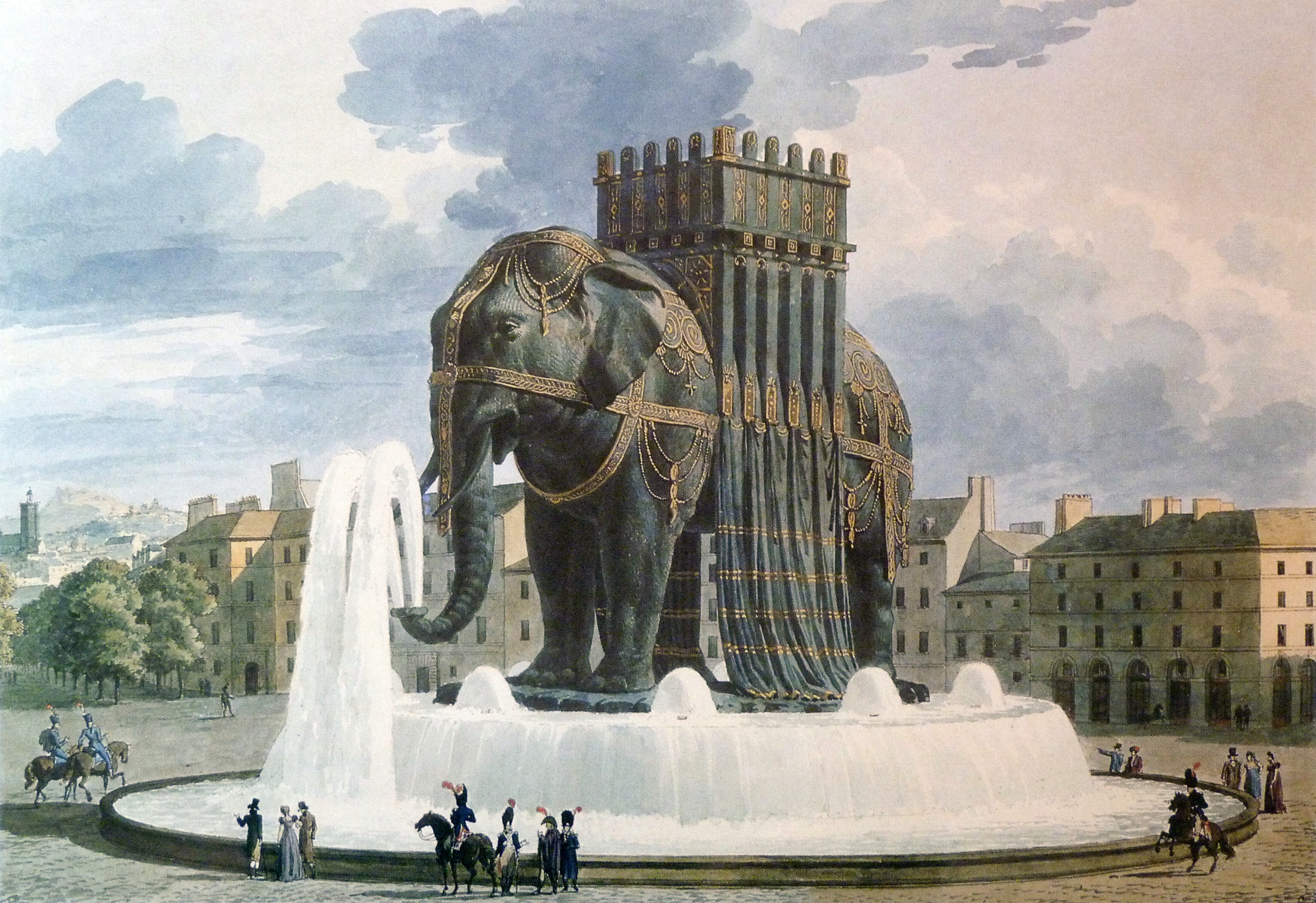
Watercolour by architect Jean-Antoine Alavoine

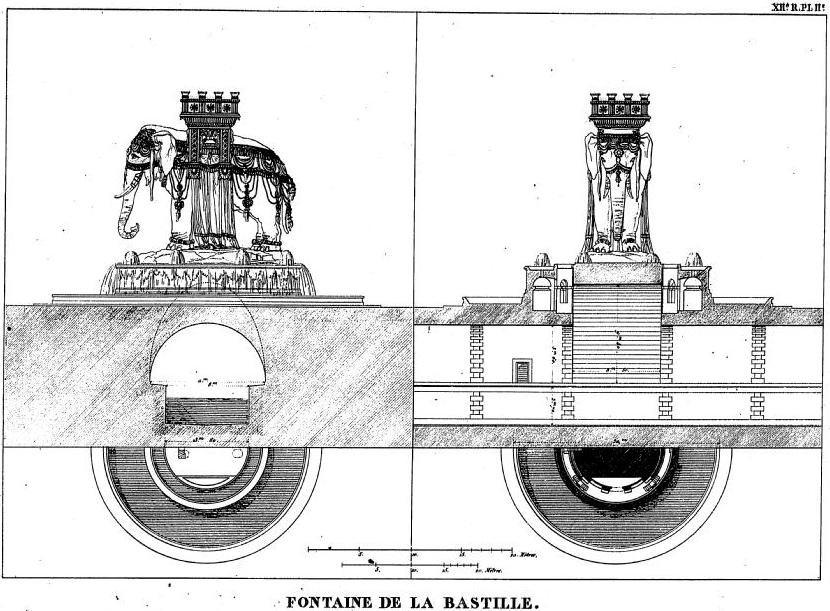
1828 representation of the fountain by Louis Bruyère

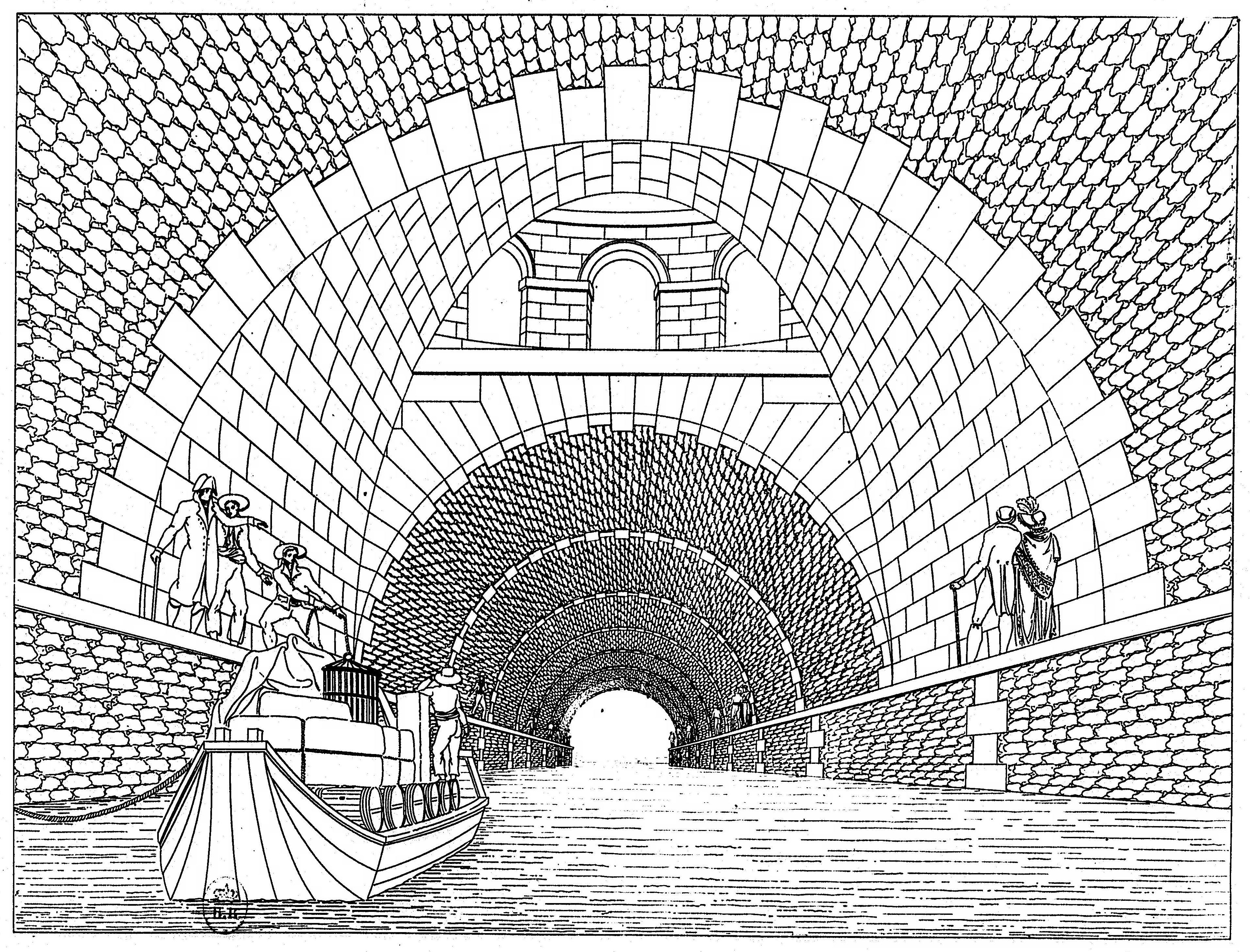
1828 representation of the Canal Saint-Martin beneath the fountain by Louis Bruyère

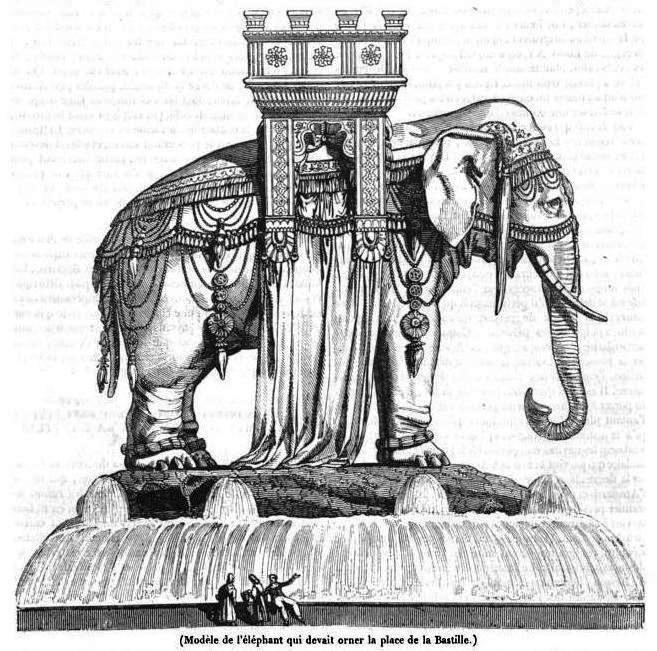
1834 engraving by an unknown artist

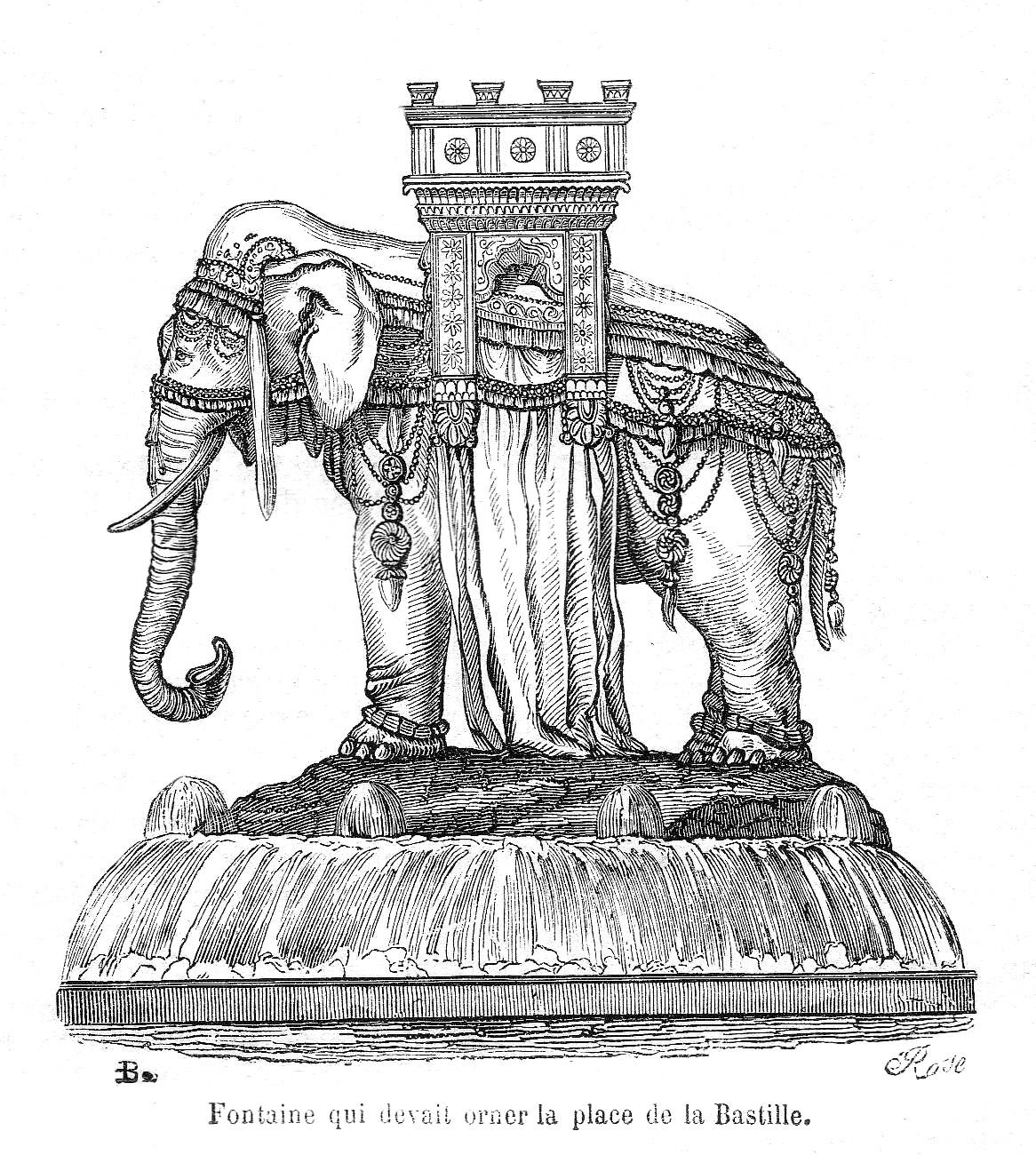
1853 drawing by Gabriel Roux

== See also ==
- Cultural depictions of elephants
- Elephantine Colossus
- Lucy the Elephant
- Elephant and Castle
- Charles Ribart, a French architect who also made plans for a giant elephant in Paris
