= Lucy the Elephant =

Building in Margate City, New Jersey

- Lucy, the Margate Elephant
- U.S. National Register of Historic Places
- U.S. National Historic Landmark
- New Jersey Register of Historic Places
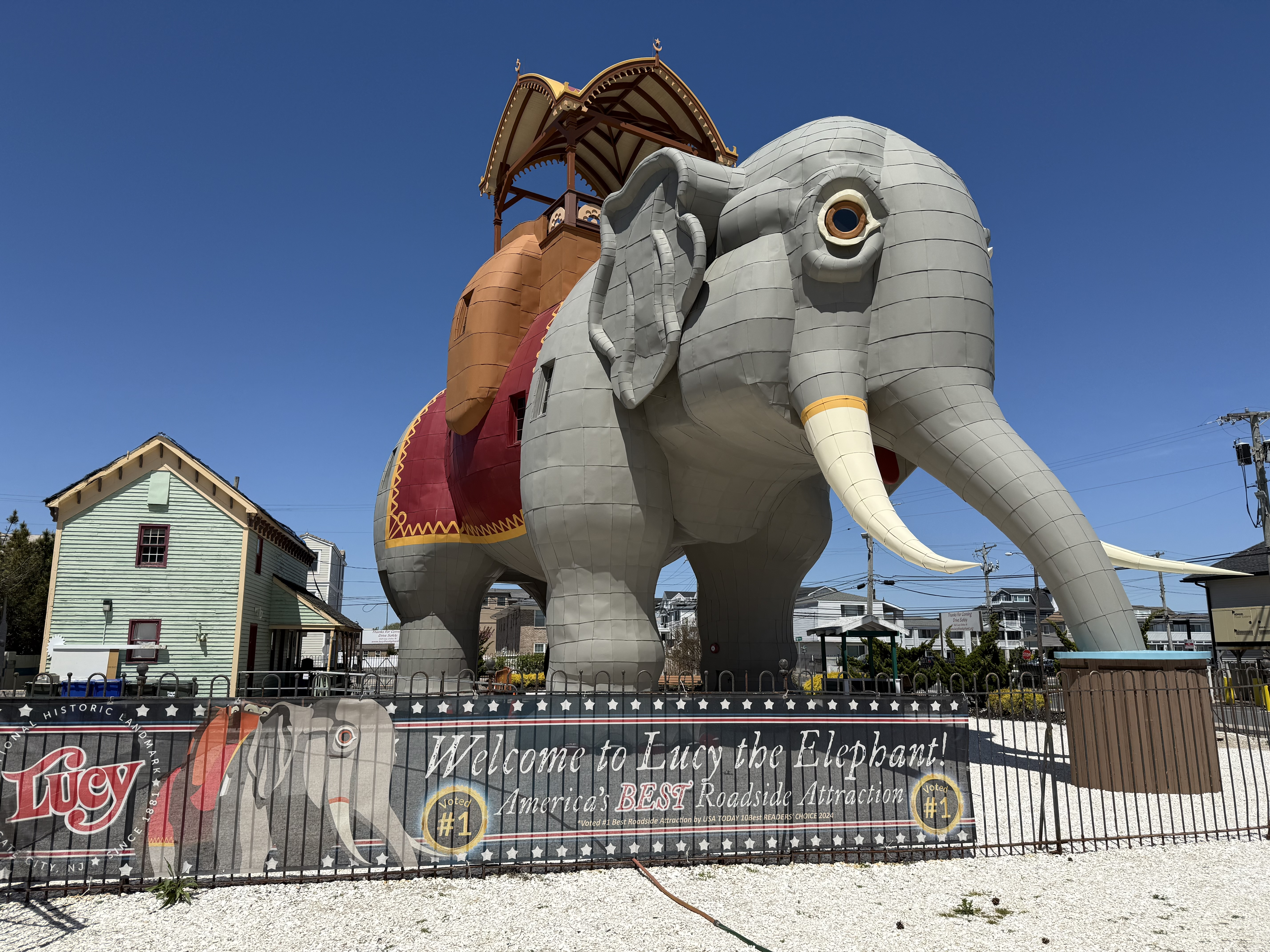
- Lucy in 2025

- Location within New Jersey Location within the United States
- Location: 9200 Atlantic Avenue, Margate City, New Jersey
- Coordinates: 39°19′14.33″N 74°30′42.85″W
- Built: 1881; 145 years ago
- Architect: James V. Lafferty
- NRHP reference No.: 71000493
- NJRHP No.: 383

Significant dates
- Birthday: July 20 - (Lucy turned 145 years old in 2026)
- Added to NRHP: August 12, 1971
- Designated NHL: May 11, 1976
- Designated NJRHP: April 7, 1971

Lucy the Elephant is a six-story elephant-shaped wood frame and tin clad building, constructed in 1881 by James V. Lafferty in Margate City, New Jersey. Lucy was built with the purpose of promoting real estate sales and attracting tourists to the area. Today, Lucy remains the oldest surviving roadside tourist attraction in the US.

== History ==
=== 1882–1899 ===
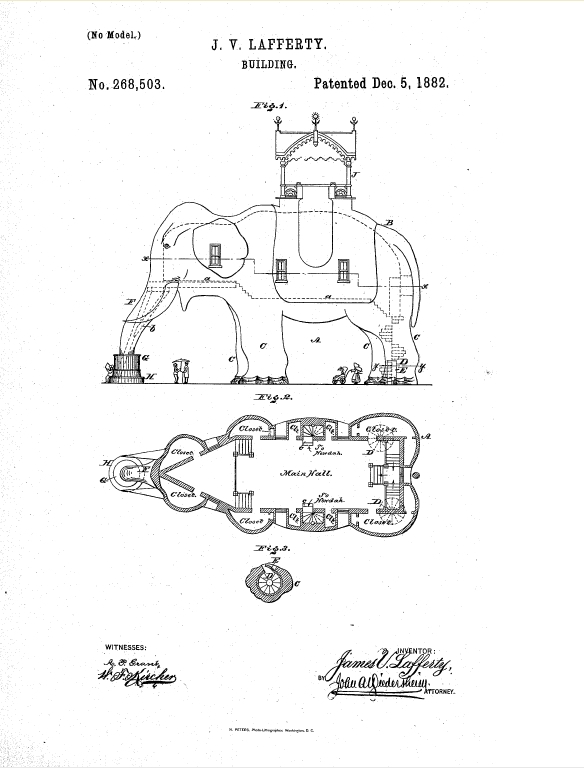
U.S. patent 268,503

==== Patenting and construction ====
On December 5, 1882, the U.S. Patent Office granted James V. Lafferty Patent #268503, giving him the exclusive right to make, use or sell an "animal-shaped building" for a duration of seventeen years. Lafferty funded the design and construction of Lucy at South Atlantic City, now called Margate. He employed Philadelphia architects William Free and J. Mason Kirby for the design of this example of novelty architecture. Lucy was modeled after Jumbo, the famous elephant with Barnum and Bailey's Greatest Show on Earth, and constructed at a cost of $25,000 - $38,000.

Initially named Elephant Bazaar, the structure stands at 65 feet (19.7 m) in height, 60 feet (18.3 m) in length, and 18 feet (5.5 m) in width and weighs about 90 tons. It is currently listed as the 12th tallest statue in the United States. Lucy was constructed with nearly one million pieces of wood, and required 200 kegs of nails, 4 tons of bolts and iron bars; 12,000 square feet of tin covers the exterior. There are 22 windows placed throughout the structure.

Lafferty later created another elephant-shaped building at Coney Island in Brooklyn and licensed the patent for another in Cape May, New Jersey.

==== Early use and sale ====
Originally, Lafferty brought potential real estate customers to view parcels of land from Lucy's howdah (carriage). The howdah offers unique views of Margate, Atlantic City's skyline, the beach, and the Atlantic Ocean and it serves as an observation deck for modern day visitors during tours.

The structure was sold to Anton Gertzen of Philadelphia in 1887 and remained in his family until 1970. Anton's daughter-in-law, Sophia Gertzen, reportedly dubbed the structure "Lucy the Elephant" in 1902. The shape of Lucy's head is characteristic of an Asian elephant, but only males have tusks. Initially, the elephant was referred to as a male, but eventually became commonly known as a female.

=== 1900–1999 ===
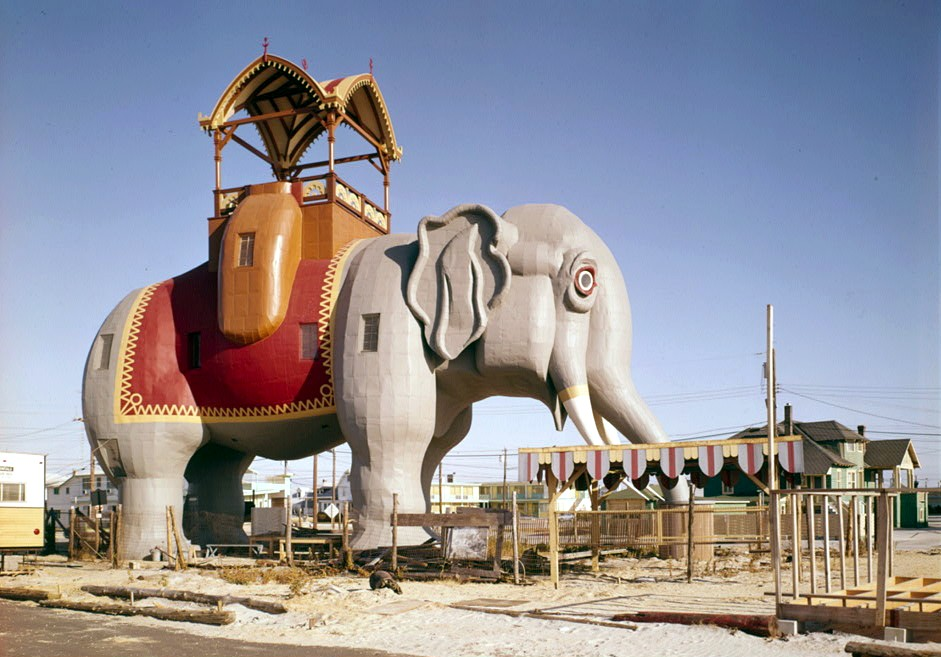
HABS image circa 1976

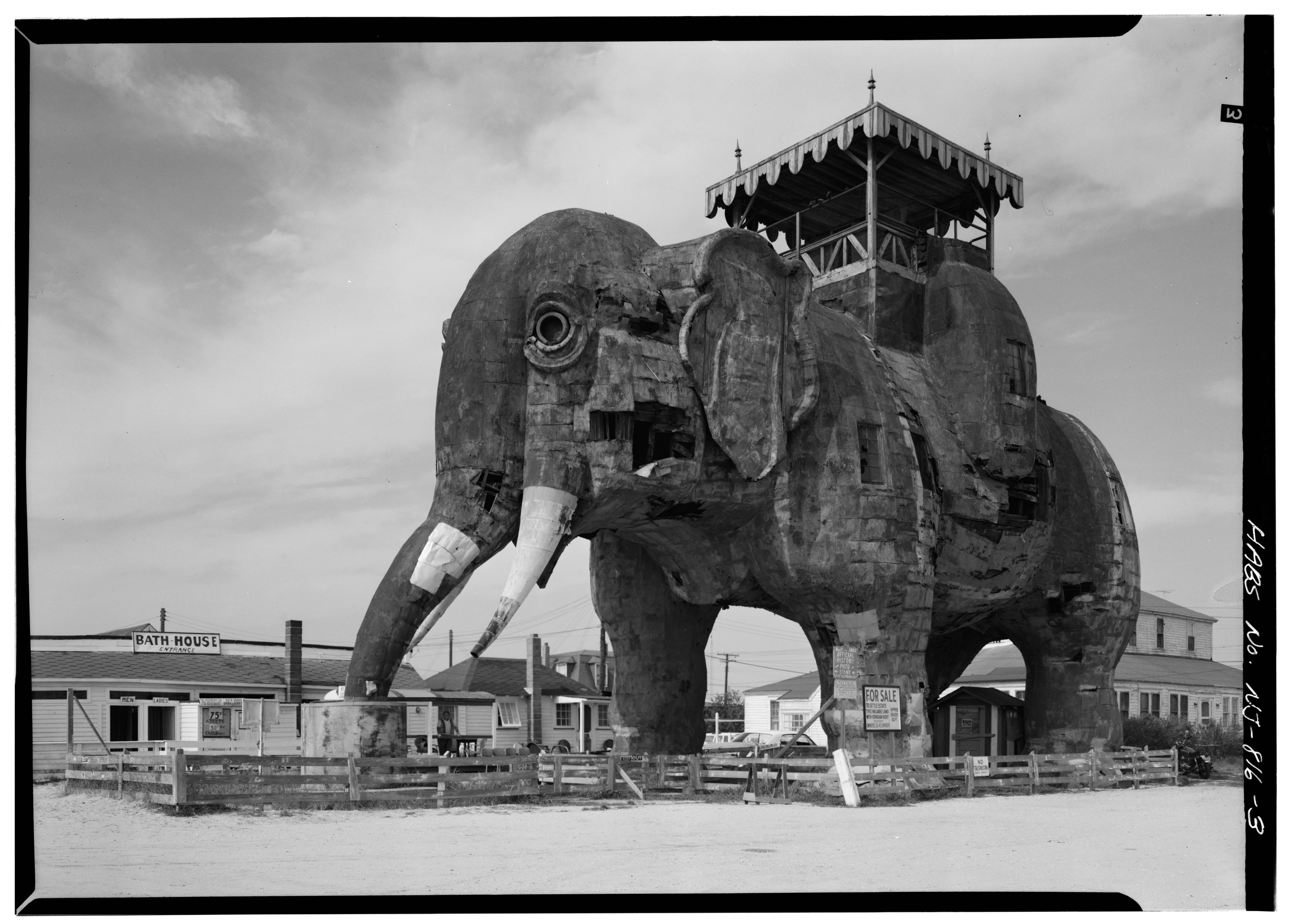
Lucy in disrepair circa 1965

Through the first half of the 20th century, Lucy served as a restaurant, business office, cottage, and tavern (the last closed by Prohibition). The building was depicted on many souvenir postcards, often referred to as "The Elephant Hotel of Atlantic City". (The actual hotel was in a nearby building, not inside the elephant.)

By the 1960s, Lucy had fallen into disrepair and was scheduled for demolition. In 1969, Edwin T. Carpenter and others formed the Margate Civic Association, which later became the Save Lucy Committee under Josephine Harron and Sylvia Carpenter. They were given a 30-day deadline to move the edifice or pay for its demolition. Lucy was spared through various fund-raising events, most notably a door-to-door canvassing campaign by volunteers.

On July 20, 1970, Lucy was moved to a city-owned lot, located about 100 yards away. The move took about seven hours and Lucy remained closed to the public for repairs until 1974. The restoration entailed supporting Lucy's original wooden frame with new steel and replacing the howdah. A plug of green glass was set into the howdah platform to refract light into Lucy's interior.

In 1971, Lucy was added to both the New Jersey Register of Historic Places and the National Register of Historic Places.

In 1976, Lucy was designated a National Historic Landmark during the United States Bicentennial celebration.

=== 2000–present ===
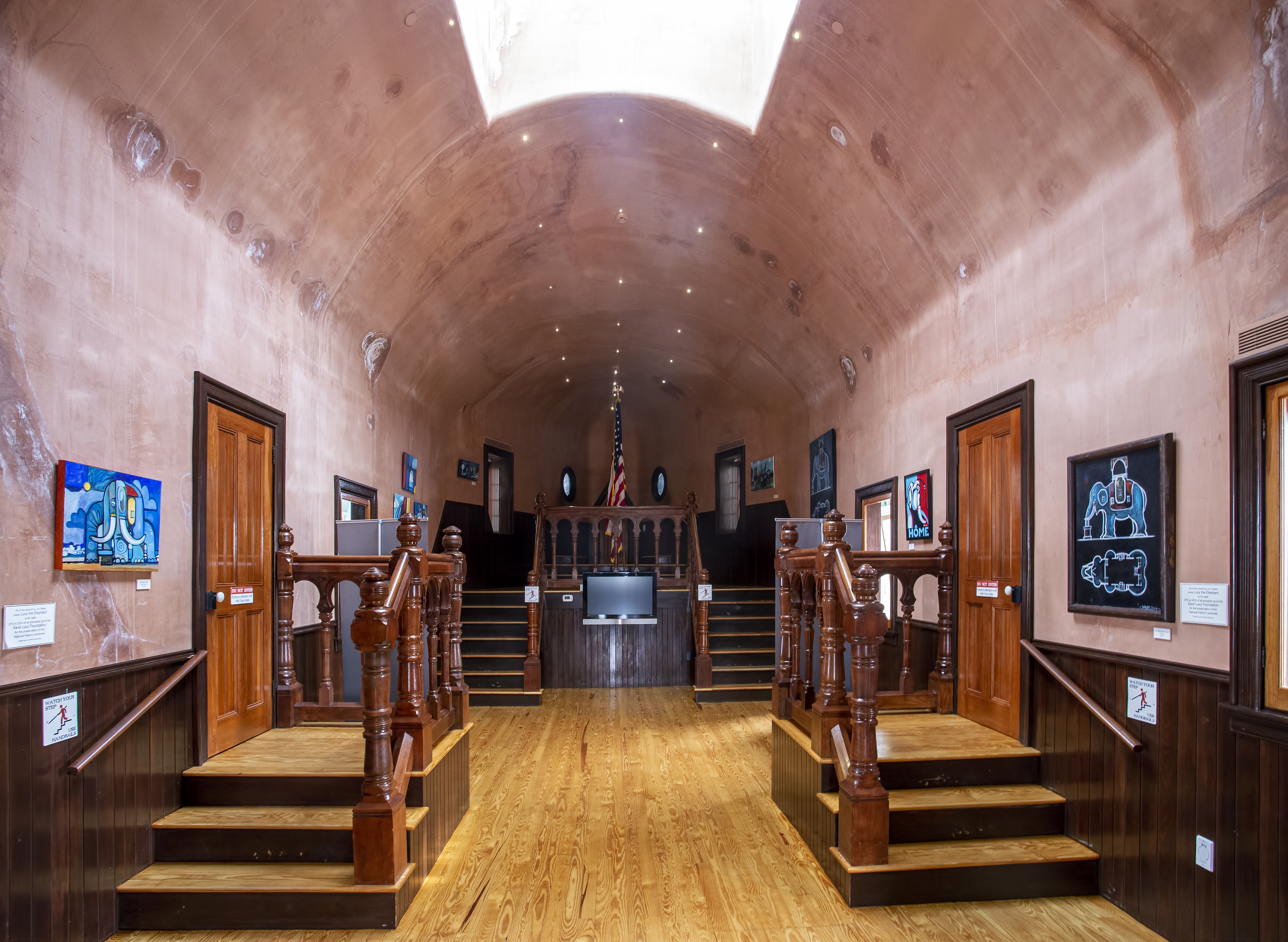
Lucy's interior in 2019

Lucy's birthday is commemorated each year on July 20, which includes a fundraising event and celebration of children's games and much fanfare.

In 2006, Lucy was struck by lightning, blackening the tips of her tusks.

In October, 2012, Hurricane Sandy made landfall near Margate. Lucy remained unscathed, although the surge reached her toes and a small booth in the parking lot was blown over.

On July 23, 2016, Lucy's staff announced the building's fake candidacy for President of the United States at a celebration for her 135th birthday. In 2016, Lucy had 135,000 visitors at the site, 35,000 of whom took the guided tour.

On February 27, 2020, Lucy began allowing overnight stays. Lucy was listed on Airbnb for $138 per night on March 17, 18 and 19, 2020. It marked the first time Lucy had been inhabited by humans since it was rented as a home in the early 1900s.

In August 2021, the Save Lucy Committee announced a plan to repair and replace the metal exterior skin after receiving a $500,000 grant from the National Park Service. The grant was based on results of a 2021 inspection that revealed that more than half of Lucy's metal skin had degraded beyond repair. The project was partially funded by a grant from the Preserve New Jersey Preservation Fund administered by the New Jersey Historic Trust. Lucy temporarily closed on September 20, 2021, with a reopening date set for Memorial Day 2022. After delays, Lucy reopened on December 28, 2022. The overall cost of the restoration was $2.4 million, a substantial increase from initial projections.

In 2023, Lucy booked a new record high of 42,267 tours, surpassing the previous record set in 2018.

On January 5, 2023, the City of Margate approved a plan to create a visitor center on Lucy's existing site. The proposed 2-story building is designed to include a retail area, information and displays, meeting spaces, and restrooms. The new structure will be located on the site of the existing gift shop and would be elevated to meet current flood codes.

On August 12, 2024, a $500,000 federal grant to fund the restoration of Lucy's interior spaces was announced. After budget cuts rescinded the grant in April, 2025, funds for the project were restored in March, 2026.

In May 2025, Lucy was voted the No. 1 Best Roadside Attraction in the country in USA Today's 2025 readers' choice awards.

== Lucy in popular culture ==
=== Movies ===
- In 1972, Lucy appeared in the movie The King of Marvin Gardens, starring Jack Nicholson and Bruce Dern.
- In 1980, Lucy can be briefly seen in the opening of the Oscar nominated film Atlantic City, starring Burt Lancaster and Susan Sarandon.
- In 1983, Lucy is shown on a postcard with a picture in the opening credits of the film National Lampoon's Vacation.
- An ice cream shop with a living area above shaped like Lucy appears in the 1991 Disney film The Rocketeer, although the film takes place in Southern California.
- The Jardin the Paris Elephant, a real-life large elephant structure inspired by Elephantine Colossus (a larger version of Lucy, built by Lafferty in 1885 on Coney Island), is featured as the location of the boudoir of Nicole Kidman's character in the 2001 film Moulin Rouge!
- In 2015, Lucy was featured in the opening credits of the film Vacation, similar to the original 1983 film, National Lampoon's Vacation.

=== Television ===
- In 1979, Lucy appeared in the intro to the short-lived CBS drama series Big Shamus, Little Shamus which takes place in Atlantic City.
- In 1986, Lucy appeared on an episode of Mister Rogers' Neighborhood, in which Fred Rogers took a short tour of Lucy.
- In November 2006, the building was prominently featured in an advertisement for Proformance Insurance.
- In 2006, the History Channel television series Weird U.S. featured Lucy in an episode.
- In 2009, Lucy was featured in an episode of Life After People, which illustrated how the environment would take over the structure without people to maintain Lucy.
- In a 2011 episode of Boardwalk Empire, Agent Van Alden mentions "a hotel shaped like an elephant" among the local attractions. Lucy is also briefly seen in the second-season episode "Gimcrack & Bunkum".
- On April 2, 2014, Lucy appeared in a clip on an episode of Strange Inheritance, which mainly featured the World's tallest thermometer, another well-known roadside attraction.
- On June 14, 2014, The Travel Channel's Monumental Mysteries featured Lucy the Elephant in an episode.
- The 2017 movie The Dunning Man shows footage of the effort to preserve the building.
- In 2021, Lucy appeared in an episode of the PBS series Drive By History which described her cultural significance in American history.
- On October 3, 2025, Lucy was featured in the series "1st Look" in an episode named "1st Look Atlantic City"

=== Digital / Print media ===
- 2012: Lucy was featured in the book Stay Close by Harlan Coben (ISBN 1101561173).
- April 18, 2015: Lucy was featured in the Bill Griffith daily comic strip "Zippy the Pinhead".
- July 2022: 'Big Potato Games' announced that Lucy will be among 49 popular national roadside attractions featured in "Zillionaires: Road Trip USA", its new Monopoly style family board game.
- May 2024: In a USA Today '10 Best Poll', Lucy was voted #1 on the 2024 list of 10 must-see roadside attractions across the country.

== See also ==
- Cultural depictions of elephants
- Elephant of the Bastille
- Charles Ribart and his plan for the site of L'Arc de Triomphe
- National Register of Historic Places listings in Atlantic County, New Jersey
- Tillie, another colorful icon of the Jersey Shore
