= James V. Lafferty =

American inventor (1856–1898)

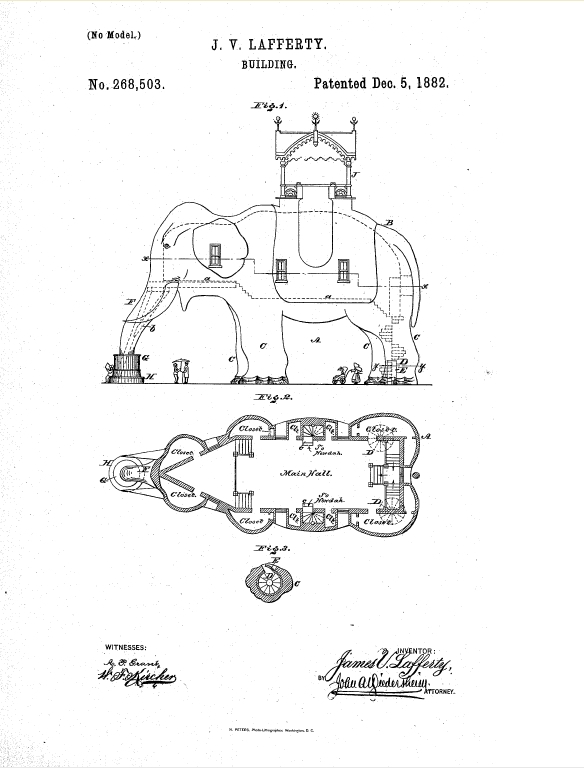
Lafferty's U.S. patent 268,503

James Vincent de Paul Lafferty, Jr. (1856–1898) was an American inventor, most famous for his construction of Lucy the Elephant, the Elephantine Colossus and The Light of Asia (also known as "Old Dumbo"). Born to Irish parents in Philadelphia, Pennsylvania, he received Patent Number 268503, on December 5, 1882 to protect his original invention, as well as any animal-shaped building.

Broke by 1887, Lafferty was forced to sell Lucy (originally named "Elephant Bazaar"). He died in 1898 and is buried in the cemetery of St. Augustine's Catholic Church in Philadelphia.

== Structures ==
=== Lucy the Elephant ===
Lucy the Elephant was constructed in 1882 in Margate City, New Jersey.

=== Elephantine Colossus (1885–1896) ===
The Elephantine Colossus or Elephant Hotel, at Coney Island amusement park in Brooklyn, New York, stood 122 feet (37.2 m) tall, approximately twice the size of Lucy, with seven floors of rooms, and legs 60 feet in circumference. With the exception of the number and relative size of the windows, and the design of the howdah, its exterior was a nearly exact scaled-up replication of Lucy. It held a cigar store in one leg and a diorama in another, hotel rooms within the elephant proper, and an observation area at the top with panoramic sea views. It burned down in 1896.

=== Light of Asia (1884–1900) ===
Light of Asia (dubbed Old Jumbo by locals) opened in Cape May in 1884, and was a slightly smaller version of Lucy. It was not successful and was torn down within 16 years. Lafferty was not directly involved with the construction but granted patent rights to Theodore M. Rieger, a real estate developer like himself, who sought to do for Cape May what Lafferty did with Lucy for Atlantic City It is unclear whether the Light of Asia matched the quality of the other buildings; the only known surviving photo of Light of Asia appears to have been taken while still under construction with no metal skin and an incomplete head, and with yet another different howdah design. A video presented to visitors inside Lucy in 2009 includes that same photo with the narration describing it as Cape May's "inferior rendition" of Lucy.

=== Prospectus for 1893 World's Columbian Exposition ===
A prospectus was published in 1892 by Kirby (while Lafferty still owned the patent) for a fourth building, even larger than Elephantine Colossus and with a moving trunk, eyeballs, ears and tail as well as a Calliope in the throat, to be built for the 1893 World's Columbian Exposition in Chicago. No actual construction was ever attempted.

== See also ==
- Charles Ribart, American architect who designed a similar elephant-shaped building
- Zoomorphic architecture
