= Ribart de Chamoust =

French architect

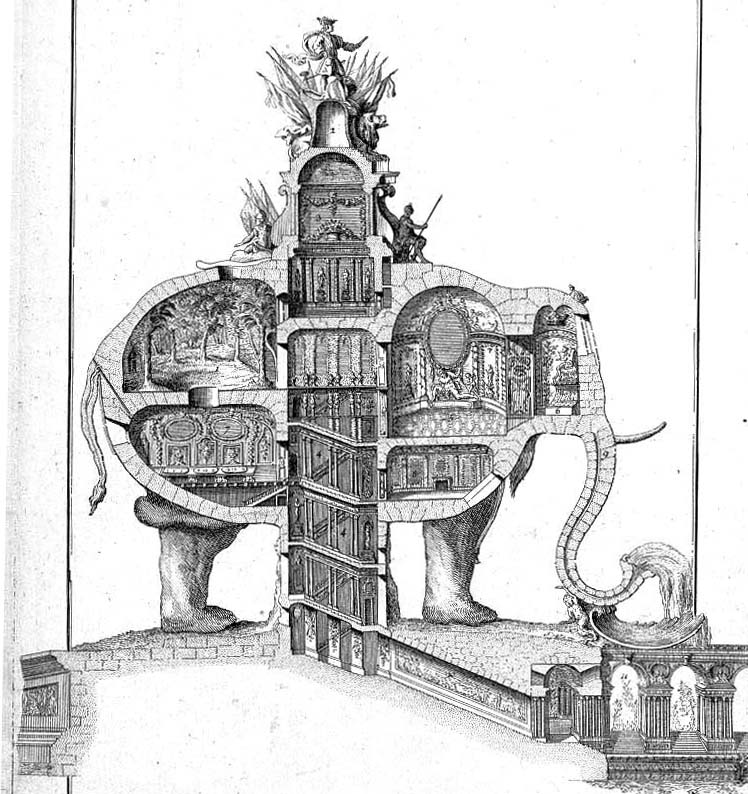
Ribart's cross-sectional plan for L'elephant triomphal, grand kiosque a la gloire du roi

François-Joseph Ribart de Chamoust (fl. 1776–1783) was an 18th-century French architect and architectural writer. His first names are unsure but are likely to be François-Joseph, though he has also been called Charles François.

== Architectural career ==
In 1758, Ribart planned an addition to the Champs-Élysées in Paris, to be constructed where the Arc de Triomphe now stands. It consisted of three levels, to be built in the shape of an elephant, with entry via a spiral staircase in the underbelly. The building was to have a form of air conditioning, and furniture that folded into the walls. A drainage system was to be incorporated into the elephant's trunk. The French Government, however, was not amused and turned him down. Napoleon would later conceive a similar construction, the Elephant of the Bastille.

Little of his work now survives.

== See also ==
- James V. Lafferty, American architect who built 3 similar elephant-shaped buildings
- Elephant of the Bastille, a Napoleon-era proposal to build an elephant-shaped fountain in Place de la Bastille.
