= Barnum Museum of Natural History =

Former museum in Massachusetts, US

Barnum Hall
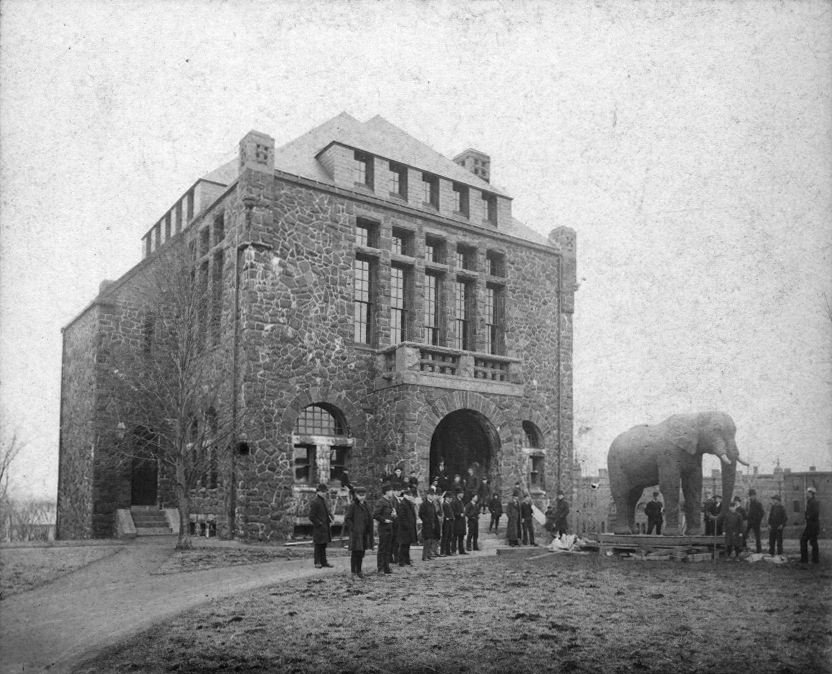
- Barnum Hall
- Former names: Barnum Museum of Natural History

General information
- Type: Classroom, laboratory, museum
- Architectural style: Romanesque Revival
- Town or city: Medford, Massachusetts
- Country: US
- Coordinates: 42.407787°N 71.120732°W
- Opened: 1883
- Renovated: 1894, 1935, 1963, 1976
- Owner: Tufts University

Technical details
- Material: Blue-gray slate
- Floor count: Three

Design and construction
- Architect(s): J. Phillip Rinn

Renovating team
- Renovating firm: Perry Shaw, Hepburn and Dean; Kubitz & Pepi

The Barnum Museum of Natural History was a natural history museum on the grounds of Tufts University in Medford, Massachusetts. The museum was established by P.T. Barnum and displayed valuable exotic dead animals from his circus. His greatest prize was the taxidermied hide of Jumbo the Elephant. The building now known as Barnum Hall was gutted when a fire destroyed the entire collection inside on April 14, 1975. The building has since been reconstructed.

== History ==
The museum was conceived as part of President Elmer Hewitt Capen's campaign to expand the university. Tufts University was founded by Christian Universalists, and Barnum, who was a lifelong Christian Universalist supporter, was targeted as a potential donor by the campaign. In May 1883, Capen persuaded Barnum to fund the project, who agreed under the condition that the transaction be kept secret, and that once his identity was disclosed the building would 'forever be called the Barnum Museum of Natural History.' The building was built to accompany his museum in Bridgeport, Connecticut. The building was designed by architect J. Phillip Rinn from the firm Andrews, Jones, Biscoe & Whitmore. The original building stood two stories tall, plus a basement, and included a laboratory and a lecture room. The ground floor featured a library and a vestibule. The upper floors contained a grand hall, 34 feet high, intended for the display of the specimens. Rinn designed the building to cohere aesthetically with the Goddard Chapel, in order to give the campus a sense of homogeneity.

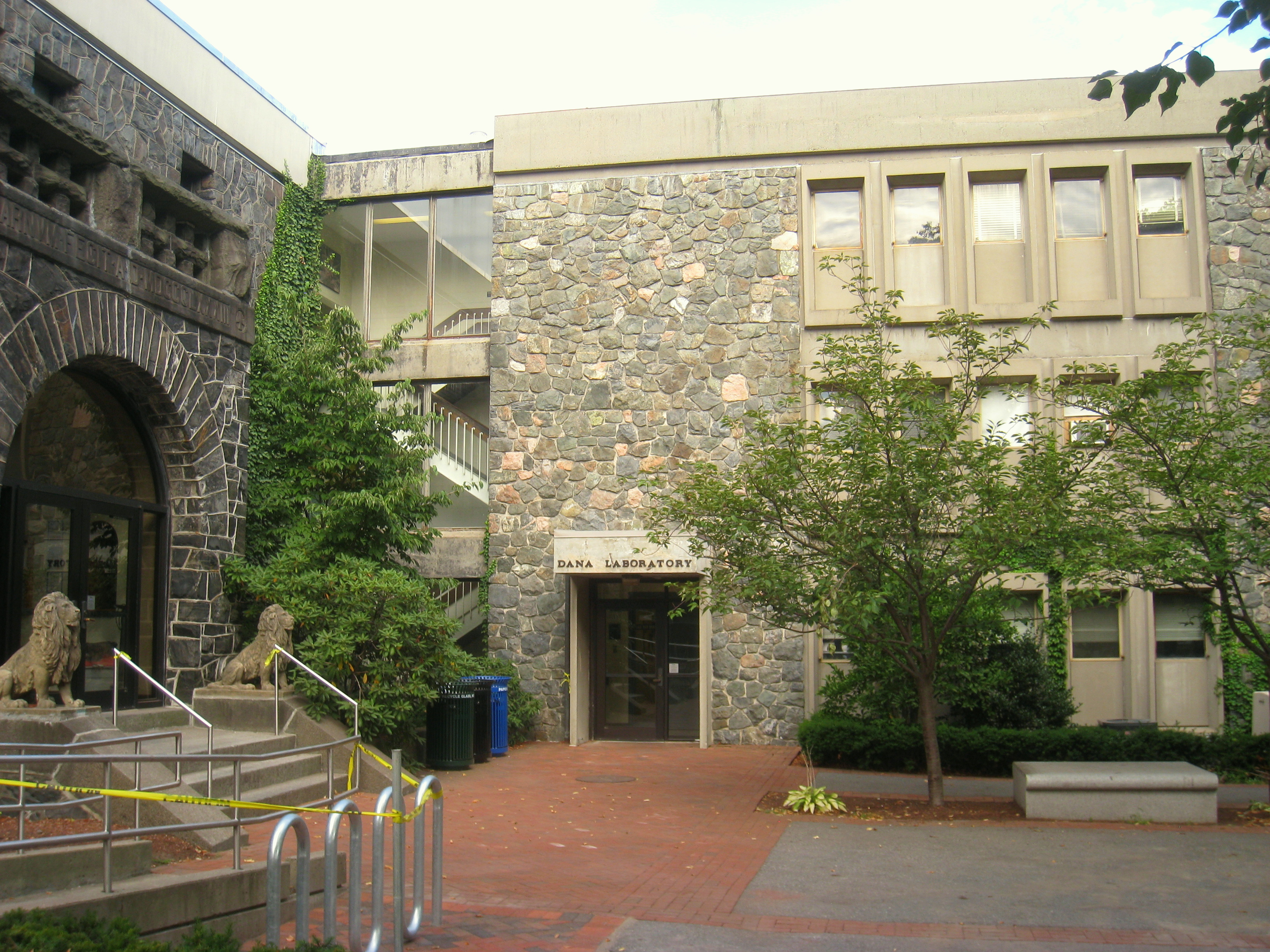
Barnum Hall today

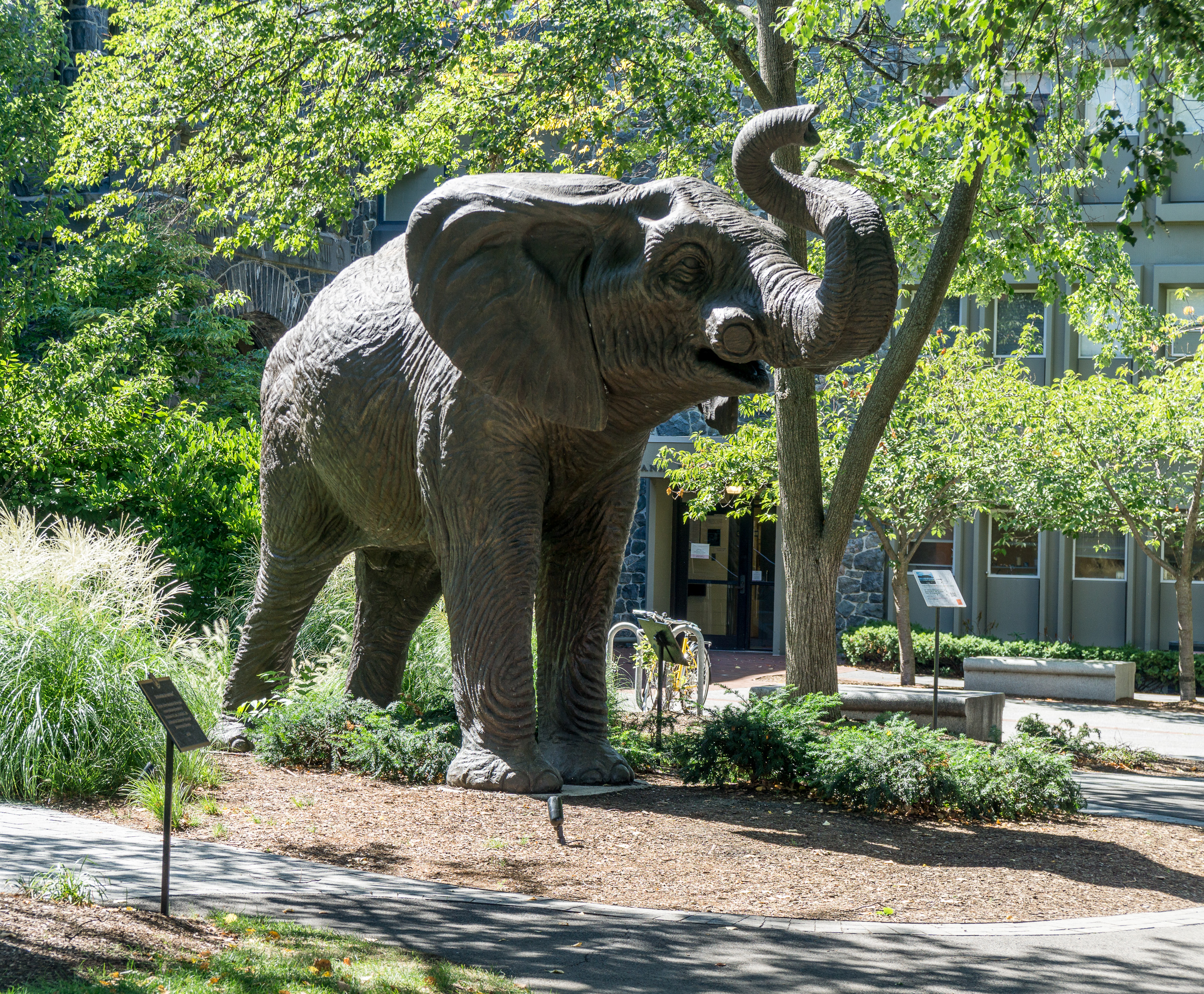
Tufts Jumbo statue commemorating the site of the museum

The museum incorporated specimens which Tufts University Professor John P. Marshall had amassed during the previous decades, mostly rocks and minerals. Additionally, Mary Goddard, one of Tufts's earliest benefactors, provided the museum with an array of coins, ethnological material, and stuffed birds. For Barnum, the museum featured one of the first of the many natural history collections which he would provide to over 200 American universities over the course of his life.

After Barnum's death in 1891, the museum continued to prosper. A further $40,000 provided by Barnum gave the museum two new wings and several new collections. The university constructed the west wing in 1894 and added a new biological laboratory, classrooms, and a library. An east wing was built in 1935 for labs and offices. The third addition, the Dana Laboratory, was built in 1963 as a $750,000 project funded by the National Science Foundation. The Dana Laboratory was designed by Perry Shaw, Hepburn and Dean and was named for Charles Dana.

== Conflagration ==
On April 14, 1975, faulty wiring in a refrigeration unit on the second floor of the building ignited a fire. By 4:30 a.m. the building and its contents were engulfed in the flames. Firefighters from eight towns were enlisted to battle the blaze and by 6 a.m. the fire was put out. Despite the size of the fire, there were no deaths. The remains of the building continued to smolder but when the smoke cleared after several days all that was left of the specimens were ashes and the metal armatures which held the remains upright. The morning after the fire, an employee entered the wreckage and swept Jumbo's remains into an empty 14-ounce Peter Pan peanut butter jar. The loss of Jumbo became international news which overshadowed the loss of invaluable research done by the Biology department.

== Aftermath ==
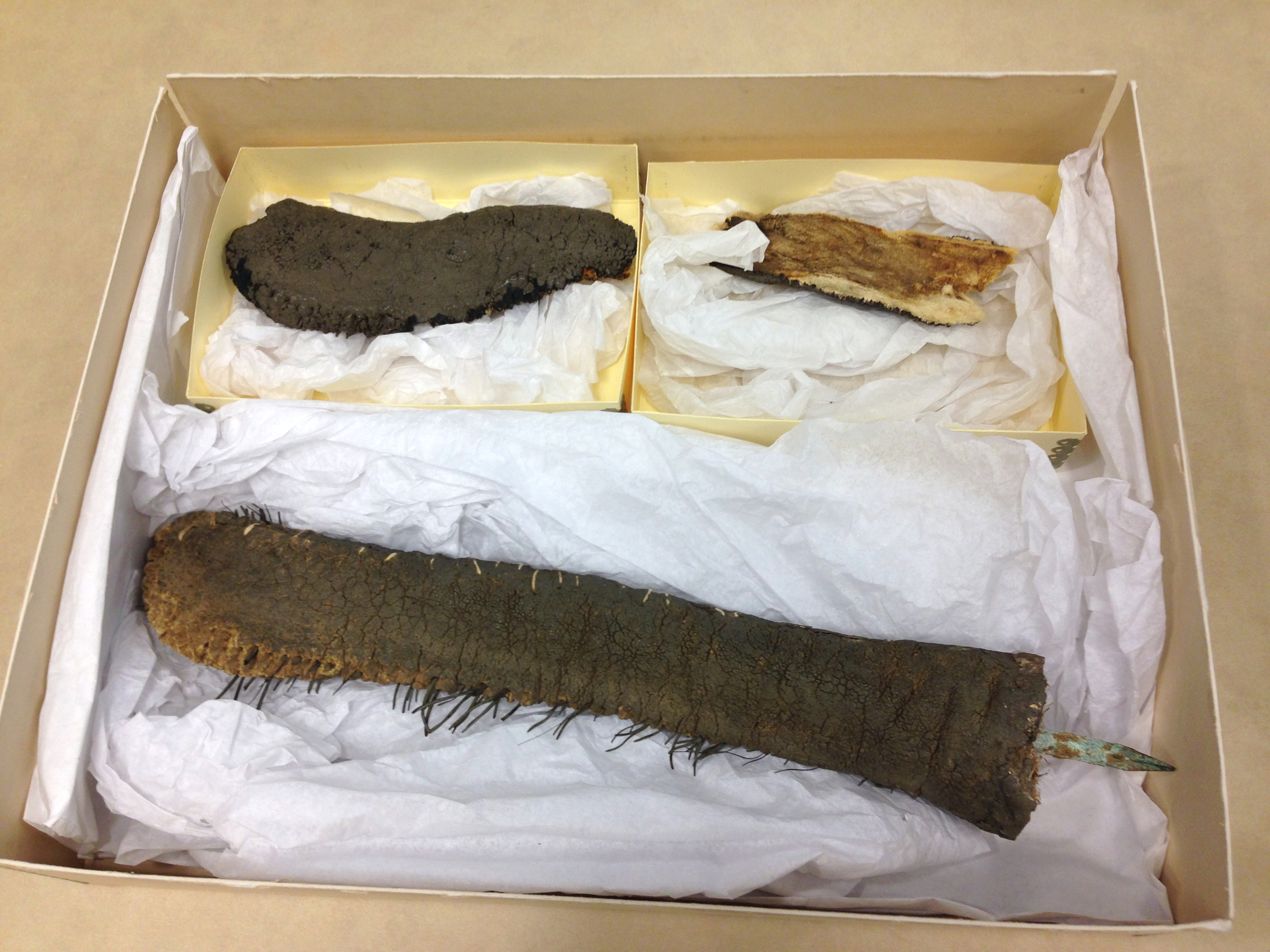
Surviving fragments of Jumbo from the conflagration

Today, Jumbo's ashes are housed in a makeshift urn, and sometimes brought out to inspire the university athletic teams. Other remains of his hide, including the tail, survived and are stored in the archives of the university.

The plan to rebuild Barnum Hall started immediately, and under President Jean Mayer the university improved the maintenance of other buildings to prevent future fires. The firm of Kubitz and Pepi was commissioned for the reconstruction; however, the original mansard roof was replaced by a flat roof. In the end, the complete interior gutting and roof replacement after the fire caused a substantial loss of architectural integrity.

In 1976, Barnum Hall reopened to students. The absence of Tufts University's mascot prompted students to place a papier-mâché statue, which once stood at Benson's Wild Animal Farm in New Hampshire, in Jumbo's place. In 2013, a university committee decided to commission Steven Whyte to create a bronze statue of Jumbo. The 5,000 pound statue was paid for by a former interim vice president of operations at Tufts. On April 27, 2015, the bronze statue was unveiled.

== Gallery ==
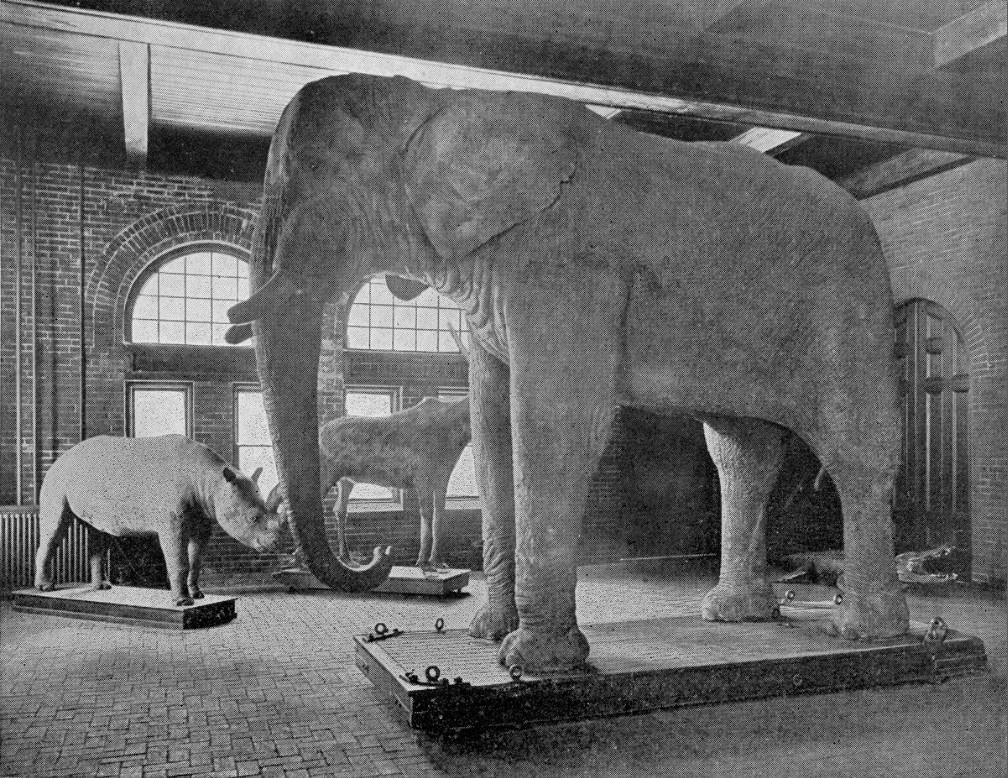

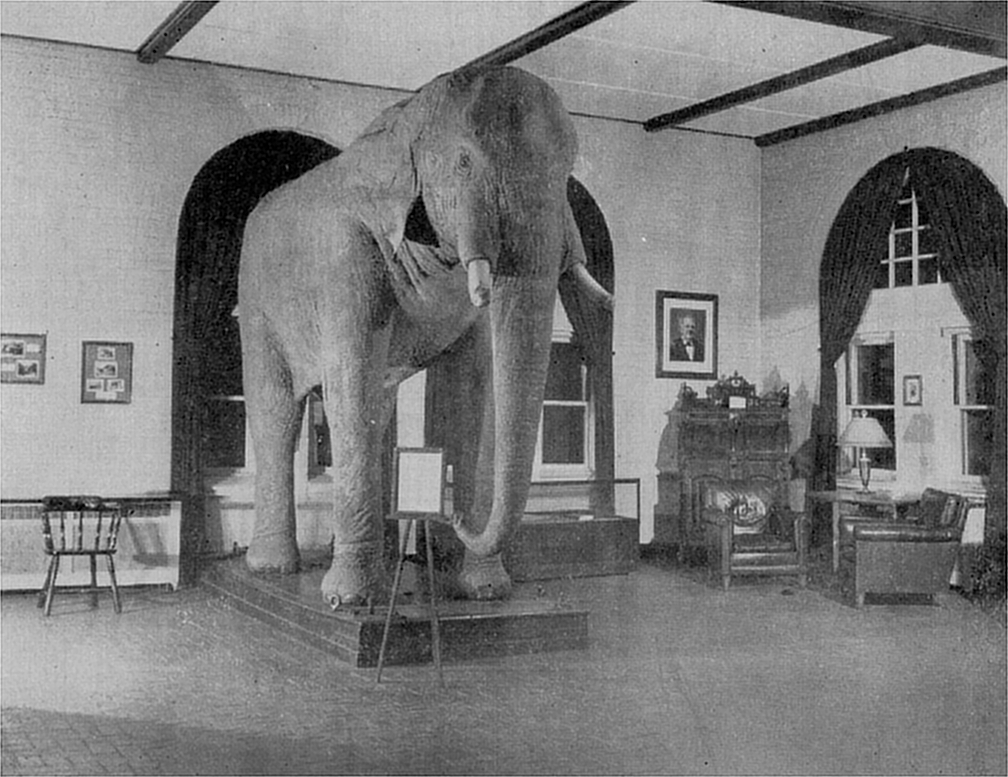
