= Elephantine Colossus =

Former tourist attraction in Brooklyn, New York

Coordinates: 40°34.6′0″N 73°58.7′0″W

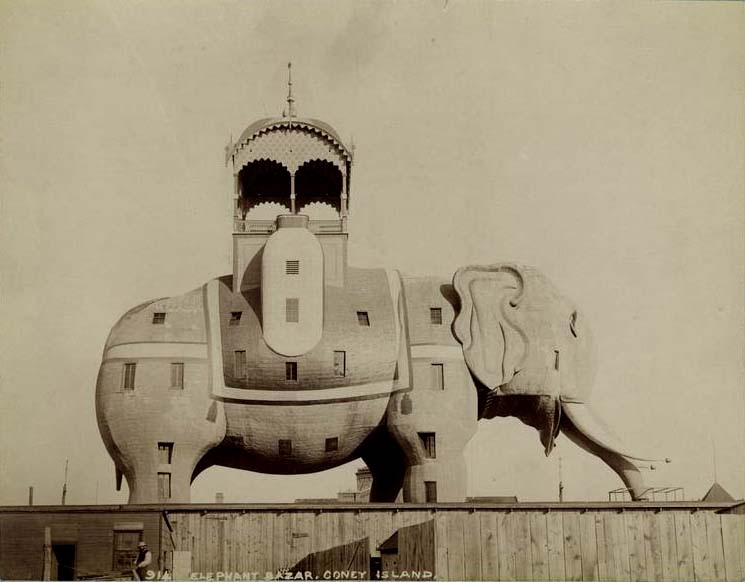
The Elephantine Colossus (unknown date)

The Elephantine Colossus (also known as the Colossal Elephant or the Elephant Colossus, or The Elephant, or by its function as the Elephant Hotel) was a tourist attraction located on Coney Island in Brooklyn, New York City, United States.

It was built in the shape of an elephant, an example of novelty architecture. The seven-story structure designed by James V. Lafferty stood above Surf Avenue and West 12th Street from 1885 to 1896, when it burned down.

During its lifespan, the thirty-one-room building acted as a concert hall and amusement bazaar. It was the second of three elephant buildings built by Lafferty, preceded by the extant Lucy the Elephant (former Elephant Bazaar) near Atlantic City, New Jersey, and followed by The Light of Asia in Cape May, New Jersey.

== Size ==
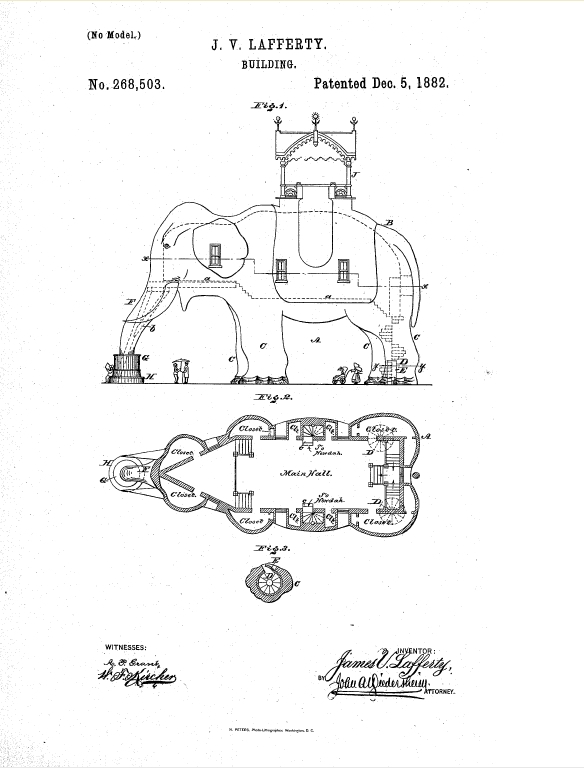
Lafferty received a patent for his Zoomorphic Architecture in 1882. U.S. patent 268,503

At 122 feet (37 m) tall, the Coney Island Elephant was approximately twice the dimensions of Lucy the Elephant, which had pre-dated it by four years; with the exception of the designs of their respective howdahs and the numbers and relative sizes of the windows, externally it was a nearly exact scaled-up copy of Lucy. Its legs were 18 feet (5.5 m) in diameter, with the front legs serving as a cigar store while the back legs held the entrance, a circular stairway. Construction was reported to have cost $65,000. Built two years before the Statue of Liberty, it was said to be the first artificial structure visible to immigrants arriving to the United States.

Construction required 3,500,000 feet of lumber, 11,000 kegs of nails, 12 tons of iron bolts and 57,000 square feet (5,300 m^{2}) of tin to cover the structure.

== Rooms and attractions ==
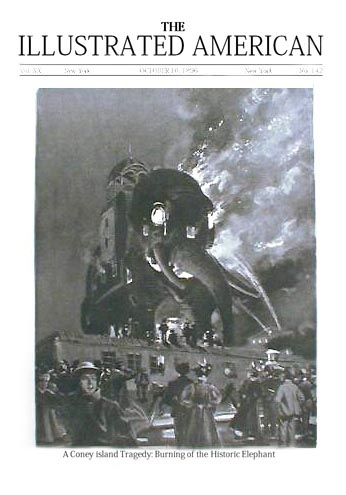
A Coney Island Tragedy: Burning of the Historic Elephant Cover from October 10, 1896, issue of The Illustrated American

Originally intended to serve as a tourist attraction, the elephant contained novelty stalls, a gallery, a grand hall, and a museum in what would be the elephant's left lung. The elephant's eyes contained telescopes and acted as an observatory for visitors. Its manager claimed to see, from the elephant's back, Yellowstone Park, Rio de Janeiro, and Paris.

As Coney Island became more established as a center of tourism and leisure, the elephant began to serve as a brothel as well.

When the elephant caught fire on September 27, 1896, it had not been used for several years. The property was afterward incorporated into Luna Park, where A Trip to the Moon stood on the site of the former hotel.

== In popular culture ==
The Colossus is featured in Victoria Thompson's 2000 mystery novel Murder on St. Mark's Place, about the murder of several call girls who may have been linked to the hotel.

== See also ==
- Lucy the Elephant, a similar, surviving beach attraction elephant in Margate, New Jersey
- A Memory Palace podcast episode covering the Colossus
- List of concert halls
- List of demolished hotels in New York City
- List of museums in New York City
- List of music venues in the United States
