= List of works by Salvador Dalí =

Salvador Dalí produced over 1,500 paintings over the course of his career. He also produced illustrations for books, lithographs, designs for theater sets and costumes, a great number of drawings, dozens of sculptures, and various other projects, including an animated short film for Disney.

Below is a chronological, though incomplete, list of Salvador Dali's works: Images of his work are subject to copyright by Gala-Salvador Dalí Foundation.

== Paintings, drawings, sculptures ==
=== 1910–1919 ===
1910–1915

1. Landscape Near Figueras (1910) The Dali Museum, St Petersburg, Florida
2. Vilabertran (1913), Private collection
3. Fiesta in Figueres (1914–1916)
4. Head of Athene (1914)
5. Landscape Near Ampurdan (1914)
6. Untitled (1914)
7. Untitled – House by a Lake (1914)
8. Dutch Interior (1915) Gala-Salvador Dalí Foundation

1916–1918

1. Empordà Landscape (1916) Gala-Salvador Dalí Foundation
2. Landscape (1916)
3. Untitled – Landscape with Animals (1916)
4. Witches and the Fall of Eve (1916–18)
5. Cadaqués (1917–18)
6. Old Man at Twilight (1917–18) Gala-Salvador Dalí Foundation
7. View of Cadaqués with Shadow of Mount Pani (1917) The Dali Museum, St Petersburg, Florida
8. Bathers (1918–19)
9. Boat (1918)
10. Couple Near the Fortress (1918)
11. Duck (1918) Gala-Salvador Dalí Foundation
12. Hort del Llané (1918–19) The Dali Museum, St Petersburg, Florida
13. Moonlit Night (1918) Gala-Salvador Dalí Foundation
14. Playa Port Alguer de la Riba, d'en Pitxot (1918–19)
15. Playa Port Alguer from Riba d'en Pitxot (1918–19) The Dali Museum, St Petersburg, Florida
16. Port of Cadaqués (Night) (1918–19) The Dali Museum, St Petersburg, Florida
17. Portdogué, Cadaqués (1918–19) The Dali Museum, St Petersburg, Florida
18. View of Portdogué (Port Alguer), Cadaqués (1918) The Dali Museum, St Petersburg, Florida
19. Portrait of Llucia (Retrato de Llucia) (1918) Gala-Salvador Dalí Foundation
20. Punta es Baluard de la Riba d'en Pitxot (1918–19) The Dali Museum, St Petersburg, Florida
21. Sa Conca Cove, Cadaqués (1918) Gala-Salvador Dalí Foundation
22. Seascape (1918–19) Gala-Salvador Dalí Foundation
23. Still Life (1918) Museo Nacional Centro de Arte Reina Sofía, Madrid
24. Untitled (1918) Gala-Salvador Dalí Foundation
25. Untitled (1918) Gala-Salvador Dalí Foundation
26. Vegetable Garden at Es Llaner, Cadaqués The Dali Museum, St Petersburg, Florida
27. Vilabertran Church Tower (1918–19)
28. Water Pitcher (1918) Museo Nacional Centro de Arte Reina Sofía, Madrid

1919

1. Es Pianc (1919) Gala-Salvador Dalí Foundation
2. Es Poal – Pianque (1919–20) Gala-Salvador Dalí Foundation
3. Evening Ball at the Patio of Mariona (1919)
4. The Lake at Vilabertran (1919) Gala-Salvador Dalí Foundation
5. Landscape (Cadaqués) (1919–20)
6. Llané Beach, Cadaqués (1919) Gala-Salvador Dalí Foundation
7. My Cousin Montserrat (1919–20) Gala-Salvador Dalí Foundation
8. Old Man of Portdogué (1919–20)
9. Orchard at Llané (Cadaqués) (1919–20)
10. Port Dogué – Cadaqués (1919)
11. The Port of Cadaqués (1919)
12. Portrait of a Gipsy (1919)
13. Portrait of Hortensia, Peasant Woman of Cadaqués (1919)
14. Portrait of Joaquim Mountainer (Allegory of a Sailor) (1919–20)
15. Portrait of Mr. Pancraci (1919) Gala-Salvador Dalí Foundation
16. Sailboat with Figure. Study for the Boat in "El Son" (1919)
17. Self-Portrait in the Studio (at Cadaqués) (1919) The Dali Museum, St Petersburg, Florida
18. Still Life: Pomegranates (1919) Gala-Salvador Dalí Foundation
19. The Tartan "El Son" (1919) Gala-Salvador Dalí Foundation
20. The Three Pines (1919) Gala-Salvador Dalí Foundation

=== 1920–1929 ===
1920

1. The Artist's Father at Llane Beach (1920) Gala-Salvador Dalí Foundation
2. L'Amore de Pierrot (1920)
3. The Bay at Cadaqués, with Cucurucuc Rock and the Sorrell Peninsula (1920)
4. Boxer (1920) Gala-Salvador Dalí Foundation
5. Calanque Jonculs (Cadaqués) (1920) Gala-Salvador Dalí Foundation
6. The Garden of Llaner (Cadaqués) (1920–21)
7. Grandmother Anna Sewing (1920) Gala-Salvador Dalí Foundation
8. The Lake at Vilabertran (1920) Gala-Salvador Dalí Foundation
9. Landscape (Cadaqués) (1920)
10. Landscape Near Cadaqués (1920–21)
11. Landscape Near Cadaqués (1920–21)
12. Moonlight Over the Bay at Cadaqués (1920) Gala-Salvador Dalí Foundation
13. Mother (1920)
14. Portrait of the Artist's Mother, Doña Felipa Dome Domenech de Dalí (1920) Gala-Salvador Dalí Foundation
15. Portrait of the Artist's Sister (1920) Gala-Salvador Dalí Foundation
16. Portrait of the Violoncellist Ricardo Pichot (1920) Gala-Salvador Dalí Foundation
17. Portrait of Joan Maria Torres (1920), Museu Nacional d'Art de Catalunya, Barcelona Gala-Salvador Dalí Foundation
18. Acrobats (Saltimbanques) (1920–21) Gala-Salvador Dalí Foundation
19. The Sardana of the Witches (1920) Gala-Salvador Dalí Foundation
20. Satirical Portrait of Trotsky (1920)
21. Self Portrait (1920) Gala-Salvador Dalí Foundation
22. Small Rocky Bay of Nans (Cadaqués) (1920–21), Museu Nacional d'Art de Catalunya, Barcelona Gala-Salvador Dalí Foundation
23. Still Life (1920) Gala-Salvador Dalí Foundation
24. Still Life by a Window (1920) Gala-Salvador Dalí Foundation
25. Studies for a Self-Portrait and Portrait of My Father (1920)
26. Study for My Family (1920)
27. Study for Portrait of My Father (1920)
28. Study for a Self-Portrait (1920)
29. Tieta (1920)The Dali Museum, St Petersburg, Florida
30. Two Gypsy Lads (1920–21) Salvador Dalí Museum, St Petersburg, Florida Gala-Salvador Dalí Foundation
31. Two Studies for Portrait of My Father (1920)
32. Untitled – the Artist in His Studio in Riba D'en Pitxot in Cadaqués (1920–21) Gala-Salvador Dalí Foundation
33. The Vegetable Garden of Llaner (1920), Morohashi Museum of Modern Art, Fukushima, Japan Gala-Salvador Dalí Foundation
34. View of Cadaqués from Playa Poal (1920) The Dali Museum, St Petersburg, Florida
35. View of Portdogué (Port Alguer) (1920) Gala-Salvador Dalí Foundation

1921

1. Back View of Cadaqués (1921) Gala-Salvador Dalí Foundation
2. Cover of "Per La Musica, Poems" (1921)
3. Fair of the Holy Cross – The Circus (1921)
4. Festival at San Sebastian (1921)
5. Festival in Figueras (1921)
6. Festival of St. Lucia at Vilamalla (1921) Gala-Salvador Dalí Foundation
7. Landscape Near Cadaqués (1921)
8. Llaner Beach in Cadaqués (1921) Gala-Salvador Dalí Foundation
9. Man Holding Up a Baby as though He Were Drinking from a Bottle (1921)
10. Man with Porron (1921) Gala-Salvador Dalí Foundation
11. Moonlight at Little Llané (1921) Gala-Salvador Dalí Foundation
12. Motherhood (1921) Gala-Salvador Dalí Foundation
13. Muse of Cadaqués (1921)
14. Nymphs in a Romantic Garden (1921) Gala-Salvador Dalí Foundation
15. The Picnic (1921)
16. Portrait of Grandmother Anna Sewing (1921) Dalí Theatre and Museum, Figueres, Spain
17. Portrait of Jaume Miravidles as a Footballer (1921–22) Gala-Salvador Dalí Foundation
18. Portrait of My Father (1921) Gala-Salvador Dalí Foundation
19. Portrait of Jaume Miravidles (1921–22) Gala-Salvador Dalí Foundation
20. Poster: Fieres i Festes de la Santa Creu (1921)
21. Romeria – Pilgrimage (1921)
22. Rural Scene (1921)
23. A Seated Man and a Dancing Couple (1921)
24. Self-portrait (1921, 36.8 x 41.9 cm) The Dali Museum, St Petersburg, Florida
25. Self-Portrait (1921, 47.5 x 30.8 cm) Gala-Salvador Dalí Foundation
26. Self-portrait (1921)
27. Self-portrait (Figueres) (1921) Dalí Theatre and Museum, Figueres, Spain
28. Self-portrait with the Neck of Raphael (1921) Gala-Salvador Dalí Foundation
29. The Smiling Venus (1921) Dalí Theatre and Museum, Figueres, Spain
30. Still Life for the Cover of "Per La Musica, Poems" (1921)
31. Tea 'sur l'herbe' (1921) Dalí Theatre and Museum, Figueres, Spain
32. Title Page of the Magazine 'Empordá Federal' and Title Design for "Biografia d'en Pep Ventura" (1921)
33. Voyeur (1921) Gala-Salvador Dalí Foundation
34. Young Girls in a Garden, The Cousins (1921), Morohashi Museum of Modern Art, Fukushima, Japan Gala-Salvador Dalí Foundation

1922

1. Brothel (1922) Gala-Salvador Dalí Foundation
2. Cabaret Scene (1922), Morohashi Museum of Modern Art, Fukushima, Japan Gala-Salvador Dalí Foundation
3. Cadaqués (1922)
4. Cubist Composition (Shapes) (1922)
5. Cubist Composition – Still Life with Guitar (1922)
6. Drinker (1922)
7. Female Figure with Head in Arms (1922) Gala-Salvador Dalí Foundation
8. The First Days of Spring (1922–23) Dalí Theatre and Museum, Figueres, Spain
9. Fishermen at Cadaqués (1922) Gala-Salvador Dalí Foundation
10. Fishing Folk at Cadaqués (1922)
11. Horse (1922)
12. Jug (1922–23)
13. Landscape – Cadaqués (1922)
14. The Lane to Port Lligat with the View of Cape Creus (1922–23) The Dali Museum, St Petersburg, Florida
15. Madrid, Architecture and Poplars (1922) Gala-Salvador Dalí Foundation
16. Portdogué and Mount Peni from the Town Hall (1922) The Dali Museum, St Petersburg, Florida
17. Seated Woman (1922)
18. Self-Portrait (1922)
19. Still Life with Pears (1922) Gala-Salvador Dalí Foundation
20. Still Life with Grapes (1922) Gala-Salvador Dalí Foundation
21. Still Life (1922)
22. Still Life (Pulpo y scorpa) (1922) The Dali Museum, St Petersburg, Florida
23. Still Life – Fish (1922)
24. Still Life with Aubergines (1922), Kunstmuseum Bern Gala-Salvador Dalí Foundation
25. Still Life with Glass (1922)
26. Study of a Foot (1922)
27. Summer Night (1922)
28. Two Girls (1922) Dalí Theatre and Museum, Figueres, Spain
29. Untitled – Landscape Near Madrid (1922–23), Museo de Arte Contemporáneo (Madrid) Gala-Salvador Dalí Foundation
30. Untitled – Scene in a Cabaret in Madrid (1922)
31. Villa Pepita (1922) Gala-Salvador Dalí Foundation

1923

1. All Shapes Derive from the Square (1923)
2. Barracks (Cadaqués) (1923)
3. Bathers of La Costa Brava – Bathers of Llaner (1923) Dalí Theatre and Museum, Figueres, Spain
4. Cadaqués (1923) The Dali Museum, St Petersburg, Florida
5. Cadaqués (Seen from the Tower of Creus) (1923) Gala-Salvador Dalí Foundation
6. Coffee House Scene in Madrid (1923)
7. Crystalline Still Life (1923)
8. Cubist Composition – Portrait of a Seated Person Holding a Letter (1923)
9. Cubist Self-Portrait with "La Publicitat" (1923) Museo Nacional Centro de Arte Reina Sofía, Madrid
10. Domestic Scene (1923)
11. El Moli – Landscape Near Cadaqués (1923)
12. Figueras Gypsy (1923) Museo Nacional Centro de Arte Reina Sofía, Madrid
13. Figures in a Landscape at Ampurdan (1923)
14. Fried Egg on the Plate without the Plate (1923)
15. Grandfather Clock (1923)
16. Group of Young Catalan Girls (1923)
17. Harlequin Sitting at a Table (1923)
18. The Jorneta Stream (1923) Gala-Salvador Dalí Foundation
19. La Jorneta (1923) Museo Nacional Centro de Arte Reina Sofía, Madrid
20. Landscape Near Cadaqués (1923)
21. Luis Buñuel and a Toreo (1923–24)
22. Maternity (1923) Gala-Salvador Dalí Foundation
23. Nude in a Landscape (1923)
24. Portrait of My Cousin Ana, Maria Domenech (1923)
25. Portrait of My First Cousin (1923)
26. Portrait of My Sister (original state) (1923–24) The Dali Museum, St Petersburg, Florida
27. Portrait of My Sister (present state) (1923–24) Gala-Salvador Dalí Foundation
28. Reverse Side of "Study of a Nude" (1923)
29. Satirical Composition ("The Dance" by Matisse) (1923) Dalí Theatre and Museum, Figueres, Spain
30. Self-Portrait (1923)
31. Self-portrait with L'Humanitie (1923) Dalí Theatre and Museum, Figueres, Spain
32. The Sick Child (Self-portrait in Cadaqués) (1923) The Dalí Museum, St Petersburg, Florida Gala-Salvador Dalí Foundation
33. Still Life (1923, 50 x 65 cm, cat no P 122) Museo Nacional Centro de Arte Reina Sofía, Madrid
34. Still Life (1923, 50 x 56, cat no P 123) Museo Nacional Centro de Arte Reina Sofía, Madrid
35. Still Life: Fish with Red Bowl (1923–24) The Dali Museum, St Petersburg, Florida
36. Study for Woman with a Child (1923)
37. Study of a Nude (1923)
38. Venus and Memory of Avino (1923–24)
39. Woman Nursing Her Son (Mujer amamantando a su hijo) (1923)

1924

1. Ana Maria (1924)
2. Bather (1924)
3. Bouquet (L'Important c'est la Rose) (1924) The Dali Museum, St Petersburg, Florida
4. Head of a Man with a Child (1924–25)
5. Pierrot with Guitar (1924) Thyssen-Bornemisza Museum
6. Plant (1924)
7. Port Alguer (1924) Dalí Theatre and Museum, Figueres, Spain
8. Portrait of Anna Maria (1924) Gala-Salvador Dalí Foundation
9. Portrait of Luis Buñuel (1924) Museo Nacional Centro de Arte Reina Sofía, Madrid
10. Portrait of Manuel de Falla (1924–25)
11. Portrait of a Woman (1924)
12. Siphon and Small Bottle of Rum (1924) Gala-Salvador Dalí Foundation
13. The Station at Figueras (1924) Gala-Salvador Dalí Foundation
14. Still Life (1924, 125 x 99 cm, cat. no. P 135) Museo Nacional Centro de Arte Reina Sofía, Madrid
15. Still Life (1924)
16. Still Life (1924)
17. Still Life: Watermelon (1924) The Dali Museum, St Petersburg, Florida
18. Triple Portrait of García Lorca (1924)

1925

1. Bay of Cadaqués (1925)
2. Cala Nans (1925)
3. Don Salvador and Anna Maria Dalí (Portrait of the Artist's Father and Sister) (1925)
4. Double-sided Verso (Studio Scene) (1925) The Dali Museum, St Petersburg, Florida
5. Female Nude (1925) Museo Nacional Centro de Arte Reina Sofía, Madrid
6. Figure at a Window (1925) Museo Nacional Centro de Arte Reina Sofía, Madrid
7. Girl from the Back (1925) Dalí Theatre and Museum, Figueres, Spain
8. Girl Reclining on a Bed (Ana-Maria Dalí) (1925)
9. Landscape Near Ampurdan (1925)
10. Landscape Near Ampurdan (1925)
11. Nude in the Water (1925) Museo Nacional Centro de Arte Reina Sofía, Madrid
12. Pierrot Playing the Guitar (1925) Museo Nacional Centro de Arte Reina Sofía, Madrid
13. Port Alguer (1925)
14. Portrait of my Sister (1925) Museo Nacional Centro de Arte Reina Sofía, Madrid
15. Portrait of the Artist's Father (1925), Museu Nacional d'Art de Catalunya, Barcelona Gala-Salvador Dalí Foundation
16. Portrait of the Artist's Father and Sister (1925)
17. Portrait of Anna Maria (Cadaqués) (1925) Museo Nacional Centro de Arte Reina Sofía, Madrid
18. Portrait of Maria Carbona (1925, 52 x 39.2 cm), Montreal Museum of Fine Arts Gala-Salvador Dalí Foundation
19. Portrait of Maria Carbona (1925)
20. Purist Drawing (1925)
21. Seated Monk (recto)(1925) The Dali Museum, St Petersburg, Florida
22. Self-portrait Dedicated to Frederico (1925)
23. Still Life (1925)
24. Still Life by Moonight (1925) Museo Nacional Centro de Arte Reina Sofía, Madrid
25. Study for "Venus and Sailor" (1925)
26. Study of a Nude (1925) The Dali Museum, St Petersburg, Florida
27. Thought (1925)
28. Venus and a Sailor (1925, 198 x 149 cm) Dalí Theatre and Museum, Figueres, Spain
29. Venus and a Sailor (1925)
30. Venus and a Sailor – (Homage to Salvat-Papasseit) (1925) Ikeda Museum of 20th Century Art, Shizuoka-Ken
31. Venus with Cupids (1925) Gala-Salvador Dalí Foundation
32. Venus with Cupids (detail) (1925)

1926

1. Abstract Composition (1926)
2. Anna Maria, Sewing (1926) Gala-Salvador Dalí Foundation
3. Barcelona Mannequin (1926) Dalí Theatre and Museum, Figueres, Spain
4. The Basket of Bread (1926) The Dali Museum, St Petersburg, Florida
5. Cubist Figure (Figura cubista) (1926)
6. Female Nude (1926)
7. Femme Couchée (Nu Alongé) (1926) The Dali Museum, St Petersburg, Florida
8. Figure on the Rocks (Figura damunt les roques) (1926)
9. Figure on the Rocks (Penya Segats) (1926)
10. Figures Lying on the Sand (1926) Dalí Theatre and Museum, Figueres, Spain
11. The Girl – Study for The Girl of Ampurdan (1926)
12. The Girl from Figueras (1926) Dalí Theatre and Museum, Figueres, Spain
13. Girl Sewing (1926) Gala-Salvador Dalí Foundation
14. Girl with Curls (1926) The Dali Museum, St Petersburg, Florida
15. Girl's Back (1926) The Dali Museum, St Petersburg, Florida
16. Homage to Erik Satie (1926) Gala-Salvador Dalí Foundation
17. Neo-Cubist Academy (Composition with Three Figures) (1926) Museu de Montserrat, Montserrat, Barcelona
18. Portrait of Federico García Lorca (1926–27)
19. Portrait of a Girl in a Landscape (Cadaqués) (1926)
20. Portrait of Sefiora Abadal De'Argemi (1926)
21. Portrait of a Woman, (unfinished) (1926)
22. Rocks at Llane (Landscape near Cadaqués) (1926)
23. Rocks of Llané (first version) (1926) Gala-Salvador Dalí Foundation
24. Sailor and His Family (1926)
25. Self-Portrait Splitting into Three (1926–27) Dalí Theatre and Museum, Figueres, Spain
26. Still Life with Two Lemons (1926) Gala-Salvador Dalí Foundation
27. Study for "Girl Sewing" (1926)
28. Study for "Girl Sewing" (1926)
29. Study for Ana Maria. Cover of the Catalogue for Dalí's Second Exhibition at the Galeries Dalmau in Barcelona (1926)
30. Study for Blood Is Sweeter Than Honey (1926)
31. Study for Girl Sewing (1926)
32. Study for Girl Sewing (1926)
33. Venus and Sailor (Girl and Sailor; Unfinished) (1926)
34. Woman in a Chemise, Lying, (Study for "Women Lying on the Beach") (1926)
35. Women Lying on the Beach (1926)

1927

1. Apparatus and Hand (1927) The Dali Museum, St Petersburg, Florida
2. Automatic Drawing (Untitled) (1927)
3. Barcelonese Mannequin (1927)
4. Figure Edged in Flames (1927)
5. Harlequin (1927) Museo Nacional Centro de Arte Reina Sofía, Madrid
6. Head (Draft of a Double Image) (1927)
7. Head of a Woman (1927)
8. Honey Is Sweeter Than Blood (1927)
9. Nude Woman in an Armchair (1927)
10. Ocell... Peix (Bird... Fish) (1927–28) The Dali Museum, St Petersburg, Florida
11. The Poet on the Beach of Ampurias – Federico Garcia Lorca (1927)
12. Saint Sebastian (1927)
13. The Severed Hand (1927–28)
14. Little Cinders (Cenicitas, Sterile Efforts) (1927–28) Museo Nacional Centro de Arte Reina Sofía, Madrid
15. Still Life by the Light of the Moon (1927)
16. Study for Still Life by the Light of the Moon (1927)
17. Untitled (1927)

1928

1. Abstract Composition (1928) Museo Nacional Centro de Arte Reina Sofía, Madrid
2. Anthropomorphic Beach (first state) (1928)
3. Anthropomorphic Beach (present state) (1928) The Dali Museum, St Petersburg, Florida
4. Anthropomorphic Beach (fragment) (1928)
5. Bather (Baigneuses) (1928) The Dali Museum, St Petersburg, Florida
6. The Bather (Beigneuse) (1928) The Dali Museum, St Petersburg, Florida
7. Thumb, Beach, Moon and Decaying Bird (1928) The Dali Museum, St Petersburg, Florida
8. Bird (1928) National Galleries of Scotland Gala-Salvador Dalí Foundation
9. Composition (1928)
10. The Donkey's Carcass (1928)
11. Female Nude (1928)
12. Feminine Nude (first State) (1928)
13. Fishermen in the Sun (1928) Gala-Salvador Dalí Foundation
14. Fishermen in Cadaqués (1928)
15. Inaugural Gooseflesh (1928) Dalí Theatre and Museum, Figueres, Spain
16. Moonlight (1928)
17. The Ram (The Spectral Cow) (1928) The Dali Museum, St Petersburg, Florida
18. Rotting Bird (1928) Gala-Salvador Dalí Foundation
19. Self-Portrait Dedicated to Federico Garcia Lorca (1928)
20. Shell (1928)
21. Soft Nude (Nude Watch) (1928)
22. The Spectral Cow (1928), Musée National d'Art Moderne, Paris Gala-Salvador Dalí Foundation
23. Sun (1928)
24. Surrealist Composition (1928)
25. Symbiotic Woman-Animal (1928) Dalí Theatre and Museum, Figueres, Spain
26. Unsatisfied Desires (1928)
27. Untitled (1928, 148 x 198 cm, cat. no P 211) Museo Nacional Centro de Arte Reina Sofía, Madrid
28. Untitled (1928)
29. Untitled (1928)
30. Untitled (the Sea and the Fishermen) (1928)
31. The Wounded Bird (1928), Tel Aviv Museum of Art Gala-Salvador Dalí Foundation

1929

1. The Accommodations of Desire (1929) Metropolitan Museum of Art, New York
2. Amalgam – Sometimes I Spit on the Portrait of My Mother for the Fun of It (1929)
3. André Breton, the Great Anteater (1929–31)
4. The Butterfly Chase (1929)
5. The Enigma of Desire: My Mother (1929) Pinakothek der Moderne, Munich
6. The First Days of Spring (1929) The Dali Museum, St Petersburg, Florida
7. The Great Masturbator (1929) Museo Nacional Centro de Arte Reina Sofía, Madrid
8. Illumined Pleasures (1929) Museum of Modern Art, New York
9. Imperial Monument to the Child-Woman (1929) Museo Nacional Centro de Arte Reina Sofía, Madrid
10. The Invisible Man (1929-1932, 140 x 81 cm, cat. no. P 237), Museo Nacional Centro de Arte Reina Sofía, Madrid
11. The Invisible Man (1929)
12. The Kiss – Study for the Couple Who Are Embracing in "The Great Masturbator" (1929)
13. The Lugubrious Game (1929) Gala-Salvador Dalí Foundation
14. Man with Unhealthy Complexion Listening to the Sound of the Sea (The Two Balconies) (1929), Museu da Chácara do Céu, Rio de Janeiro Gala-Salvador Dalí Foundation
15. Phantasmagoria (Daybreak) (1929) Gala-Salvador Dalí Foundation
16. Portrait of Paul Eluard (1929) Gala-Salvador Dalí Foundation
17. Profanation of the Host (1929) The Dali Museum, St Petersburg, Florida
18. Studies for The Enigma of Desire and Memory of the Child-Woman (1929)
19. Study for The Enigma of Desire – My Mother, My Mother, My Mother (1929)
20. Study for The Great Masturbator (1929)
21. Study for The Lugubrious Game (1929)
22. Study for Invisible Sleeping Woman, Horse, Lion and for Paranoiac Woman-Horse (1929–1939)

=== 1930–1939 ===
1930

1. Andromeda (1930)
2. The Average Bureaucrat (1930) The Dali Museum, St Petersburg, Florida
3. The Bleeding Roses (1930), ABANCA Art collection, A Coruña Gala-Salvador Dalí Foundation
4. Chocolate (1930)
5. Consequences: Dalí, Gala Eluard, Valentine Hugo, André Breton (1930)
6. The Feeling of Becoming (1930) Gala-Salvador Dalí Foundation
7. Fish Man (1930), Meadows Museum, SMU, Dallas, Texas
8. The Font (1930) The Dali Museum, St Petersburg, Florida
9. Free Inclination of Desire (1930) Yale University Art Gallery
10. The Ghost of the Evening (1930)
11. Gradiva (Study for "The Invisible Man") (1930)
12. The Great Masturbator – Frontispiece for "The Visible Woman" (1930)
13. The Hand (La main) (1930) The Dali Museum, St Petersburg, Florida
14. Head of Hair (1930)
15. Invisible Sleeping Woman Horse Lion (1930, 50.2 x 65.2 cm), Musée National d'Art Moderne, Paris
16. Invisible Sleeping Woman (1930)
17. Oedipus Complex (1930)
18. Paranoiac Woman-Horse (1930)
19. Portrait of Mr. Emilio Terry (unfinished) (1930) Dalí Theatre and Museum, Figueres, Spain
20. Premature Ossification of a Railway Station (1930) Gala-Salvador Dalí Foundation
21. Pyre. Poster Design for the 10th Anniversary of the French Communist Party (1930)
22. The Red Tower (Anthropomorphic Tower) (1930) Art Institute of Chicago
23. Study for "The Dream" (1930)
24. Study for "Invisible Sleeping Woman, Horse, Lion" (1930)
25. Study for "Invisible Sleeping Woman, Horse, Lion" (1930)
26. Tactile Cinema (1930–31)
27. Untitled – Feminine Nude – Frontispiece of "La Femme Visible" (1930)
28. Vertigo (1930) Gala-Salvador Dalí Foundation
29. William Tell (1930)

1931

1. The Anthropomorphous Echo (Solitude) (1931) Gala-Salvador Dalí Foundation
2. Board of Demented Associations (Fireworks) (1931) Gala-Salvador Dalí Foundation
3. Combinations (or The Combined Dalínian Phantasms: Ants, Keys, Nails) (1931)
4. Diurnal Fantasies (1931) The Dali Museum, St Petersburg, Florida
5. Diurnal Illusion: the Shadow of a Grand Piano Approaching (1931) Gala-Salvador Dalí Foundation
6. The Dream (1931)
7. Erotic Drawing (1931)
8. Figure Clock (1931)
9. Gala (1931) Dalí Theatre and Museum, Figueres, Spain
10. Gradiva (1931) Gala-Salvador Dalí Foundation
11. Gradiva Rediscovers Anthropomorphic Ruins (1931) Thyssen-Bornemisza Museum
12. Landscape (1931)
13. Le Spectre et le Fantome (1931)
14. Mme. Reese (1931)
15. The Old Age of William Tell (1931) Gala-Salvador Dalí Foundation
16. Olive (1931)
17. On the Seashore (Au bord de la mer) (1931) The Dali Museum, St Petersburg, Florida
18. Paranoiac Visage – Postcard Sent by Picasso to Dalí (1931)
19. Partial Hallucination. Six Apparitions of Lenin on a Grand Piano (1931)
20. The Persistence of Memory (1931) Museum of Modern Art, New York
21. Portrait of Gala (1931)
22. Remorse or Sunken Sphinx (1931), Eli and Edythe Broad Art Museum, Michigan State University Gala-Salvador Dalí Foundation
23. Shades of Night Descending (1931) The Dali Museum, St Petersburg, Florida
24. Solitude (1931), Wadsworth Atheneum, Hartford, Connecticut Gala-Salvador Dalí Foundation
25. Symbiosis of a Head of Seashells (1931) Gala-Salvador Dalí Foundation
26. Untitled (William Tell and Gradiva) (1931)
27. Untitled (1931)
28. Untitled – Erotic Drawing (1931)
29. Vegetal Metamorphosis (1931) Gala-Salvador Dalí Foundation
30. Woman Sleeping in a Landscape (1931), Peggy Guggenheim Collection, Venice Gala-Salvador Dalí Foundation
31. They Were There (1931)

1932

1. Agnostic Symbol (1932) Philadelphia Museum of Art, Philadelphia, Pennsylvania
2. Anthropomorphic Bread (1932)
3. Anthropomorphic Bread (1932)
4. Automatic Beginning of a Portrait of Gala (unfinished) (1932)
5. The Average Fine and Invisible Harp (1932) Gala-Salvador Dalí Foundation
6. Babaouo – Publicity Announcement for the Publication of the Scenario of the Film (1932)
7. The Birth of Liquid Desires (1932), Solomon R. Guggenheim Museum, New York
8. The Birth of Liquid Fears (1932)
9. Catalan Bread (1932) The Dali Museum, St Petersburg, Florida
10. Detail of "Meditation on The Harp" (1932–34)
11. Diurnal Fantasies (1932)
12. The Dream Approaches (1932–33)
13. Eggs on the Plate Without the Plate (1932, 60.3 x 41.9 cm, cat no P 297) The Dali Museum, St Petersburg, Florida
14. Eggs on the Plate Without the Plate (1932, 55 x 46 cm, cat no P 402) Gala-Salvador Dalí Foundation
15. Figure Study for "William Tell" (1932)
16. Frontispiece for "Le Revolver II, Cheveux Blancs" by André Breton (1932)
17. Gradiva (1932)
18. House for Erotomaniac (1932) Gala-Salvador Dalí Foundation
19. The Invisible Man (1932) The Dali Museum, St Petersburg, Florida
20. The Knight at the Tower (1932) Gala-Salvador Dalí Foundation
21. The Meeting of the Illusion and the Arrested Moment – Fried Eggs Presented in a Spoon (1932) Gala-Salvador Dalí Foundation
22. Memory of the Child-Woman (1932) The Dali Museum, St Petersburg, Florida
23. The Mysterious Sources of Harmony (1932–33) Gala-Salvador Dalí Foundation
24. Nostalgia of the Cannibal (1932), Sprengel Museum, Hanover Gala-Salvador Dalí Foundation
25. Ordinary French Loaf with Two Fried Eggs Riding Without a Plate (1932), Toyota Municipal Museum of Art Gala-Salvador Dalí Foundation
26. Paranoaic Metamorphosis of Gala's Face (1932)
27. Phosphene of Della Porta (1932) Gala-Salvador Dalí Foundation
28. Portrait of the Viscountess Marie-Laure de Noailles (1932) Gala-Salvador Dalí Foundation
29. Portrait of Gala (1932–33) The Dali Museum, St Petersburg, Florida
30. Preliminary Study for "Portrait of Vicomtesse Marie-Laure Cle Noailles" (1932)
31. Studies for "Weaning of Furniture-Nutrition" (1932–33)
32. Study for the Nurse in "The Weaning of Furniture-Nutrition" (1932–33)
33. Study for "Large Painting" (1932)
34. Study for "Meditation on The Harp" (1932–33)
35. Study for "Memory of the Child-Woman" (1932)
36. Suez (1932) The Dali Museum, St Petersburg, Florida
37. Surrealist Architecture (1932), Kunstmuseum Bern Gala-Salvador Dalí Foundation
38. Surrealist Essay (1932) Israel Museum, Jerusalem
39. Surrealist Objects Gauge of Instantaneous Memory (1932) Gala-Salvador Dalí Foundation
40. The True Painting of "The Isle of the Dead" by Arnold Bocklin at the Hour of the Angelus (1932), Von der Heydt Museum, Wuppertal Gala-Salvador Dalí Foundation
41. Untitled (1932)
42. Untitled (Erotic Drawing) (1932)
43. Untitled – Cyclist with a Loaf of Bread on His Head (1932)
44. Untitled – Female Figure with Catalonian Bread (1932)
45. The Veiled Heart (1932) Gala-Salvador Dalí Foundation
46. William Tell, Gradiva and The Average Bureaucrat (1932)

1933

1. Ambivalent Image (1933), André-François Petit collection, Paris Gala-Salvador Dalí Foundation
2. Apparition of My Cousin Carolineta on the Beach at Rosas (1933)
3. The Architectural Angelus of Millet (1933) Museo Nacional Centro de Arte Reina Sofía, Madrid
4. Atmospheric Chair (1933) Art Institute of Chicago
5. Automatic Beginning of a Portrait of Gala (1933) Dalí Theatre and Museum, Figueres, Spain
6. Average Atmospherocephalic Bureaucrat in the Act of Milking a Cranial Harp (1933) The Dali Museum, St Petersburg, Florida
7. Bureaucrat and Sewing Machine – Illustration for "Les Chants de Maldoror" (1933)
8. The Bust of a Retrospective Woman (1933) Museum of Modern Art, New York
9. Cannibalism of Objects (inscribed: Meat Glass, Meat Aeroplane, Meat Spoon, Meat Watch, Meat Head) (1933)
10. Cannibalism. Illustrations for "Les Chants de Maldoror" by Lautreamont (1933)
11. The Enigma of William Tell (1933) Moderna Museet, Stockholm
12. Flesh Aeroplane. Illustration for "Les Chants De Maldoror" by Lautreamont (1933)
13. Gala and the Angelus of Millet Preceding the Imminent Arrival of the Conical Anamorphoses (1933) National Gallery of Canada, Ottawa Gala-Salvador Dalí Foundation
14. Geological Destiny (1933) Gala-Salvador Dalí Foundation
15. Gradiva (1933)
16. Illustration for Les Chants de Maldoror by the Count of Lautreamont (1933–34)
17. The Judges (1933)
18. Knight of Death (variant) (1933)
19. Myself at the Age of Ten when I was the Grasshopper Child (1933) The Dali Museum, St Petersburg, Florida
20. Necrophilic Fountain Flowing from a Grand Piano (1933) Gala-Salvador Dalí Foundation
21. The Phantom Cart (1933, 19 x 24.2 cm) Dalí Theatre and Museum, Figueres, Spain
22. The Phantom Cart (1933, 16.9 x 21.9 cm) Yale University Art Gallery
23. The Phenomenon of Ecstasy (1933)
24. Portrait of Gala with Two Lamb Chops Balanced on Her Shoulder (1933) Dalí Theatre and Museum, Figueres, Spain
25. Reverie – Password: Mess Up, All the Slate (1933)
26. Soft Watches (1933)
27. Study for "The Enigma of William Tell" (1933)
28. Study for "Portrait of the Vicomtesse de Noailles" (1933)
29. Sugar Sphinx (1933) The Dali Museum, St Petersburg, Florida
30. Sugar Sphinx (detail) (1933)
31. Surrealist Figure in the Landscape of Port Lligat (1933)
32. Surrealist Figures, Joint Drawing by Dalí and Picasso (1933)
33. Surrealist Horse – Woman-Horse (1933)
34. The Temple of Love (1933)
35. The Triangular Hour (1933), Kagoshima City Museum of Art, Japan Gala-Salvador Dalí Foundation
36. Two Faces of Gala (1933–34)
37. Untitled (1933–34)
38. Untitled (Study for Parts of "Invisible Harp, Fine and Medium" and Parts of "Skull with Its Lyric Appendage Leaning on a Bedside, Table...") (1933)
39. Untitled – Death Outside the Head/Paul Eluard (1933)

1934

1. Aerodynamic Chair (1934) Gala-Salvador Dalí Foundation
2. Allegory of an American Christmas (1934)
3. Apparition of My Cousin Carolinetta on the Beach at Roses (1934, 73 x 100 cm, cat no P 379) Gala-Salvador Dalí Foundation
4. Apparition of My Cousin Carolinetta on the Beach at Roses (1934, 73 x 100, cat no P 380) Gala-Salvador Dalí Foundation
5. Atavisms at Twilight (1934)
6. Atavistic Vestiges After the Rain (1934) Gala-Salvador Dalí Foundation
7. Atmospheric Skull Sodomizing a Grand Piano (1934) The Dali Museum, St Petersburg, Florida
8. Bust of Joella Lloyd (1934)
9. Cannibalism of the Praying Mantis of Lautreamont (1934) Gala-Salvador Dalí Foundation
10. Cardinal, Cardinal! (1934), Munson-Williams-Proctor Arts Institute, Utica, New York Gala-Salvador Dalí Foundation
11. Conic Anamorphosis (1934)
12. Consequences (1934)
13. Consequences: Gala Eluard, Dalí, André Breton, Valentine Hugo (1934)
14. Consequences: Gala Eluard, Valentine Hugo, André Breton, Dalí (1934)
15. Consequences: Valentine Hugo, André Breton, Gala Eluard, Dalí (1934)
16. Consequences: Valentine Hugo, Dalí, André Breton, Gala Eluard (1934)
17. Eclipse and Vegetable Osmosis (1934)
18. Enigmatic Elements in the Landscape (1934) Dalí Theatre and Museum, Figueres, Spain
19. Figure – Omelettes (1934)
20. Figure and Drapery in a Landscape (1934) Dalí Theatre and Museum, Figueres, Spain
21. Figure with Drawers for a Four-part Screen (1934)
22. Fossil Cloud (1934) Gala-Salvador Dalí Foundation
23. The Ghost of Vermeer of Delft Which Can Be Used As a Table (1934) The Dali Museum, St Petersburg, Florida
24. Ghost of Vermeer Van Delft (1934, 22.8 x 18.7 cm, cat no 366) Gala-Salvador Dalí Foundation
25. The Ghost of Vermeer van Delft (1934, 23 x 19 cm, cat no 367) Gala-Salvador Dalí Foundation
26. Hairdresser Depressed by the Persistent Good Weather (1934), Perls Galleries, New York Gala-Salvador Dalí Foundation
27. Homage to Millet – for Cecile, in Friendship (1934)
28. The Hour of the Crackled Visage (1934) Gala-Salvador Dalí Foundation
29. Hysterical and Aerodynamic, Nude – Woman on the Rock (1934)
30. The Invisible Harp (1934) Gala-Salvador Dalí Foundation
31. The Isle of the Dead – Centre, Section – Reconstructed, Compulsive Image, After Becklin (1934) Gala-Salvador Dalí Foundation
32. The Javanese Mannequin (1934) The Dali Museum, St Petersburg, Florida
33. The Knight of Death (1934) Gala-Salvador Dalí Foundation
34. The Knight of Death (Horseman) (1934) Gala-Salvador Dalí Foundation
35. The Little Theater (1934) The Museum of Modern Art, New York
36. Masochistic Instrument (1934) Gala-Salvador Dalí Foundation
37. Meditation on the Harp (1934) The Dali Museum, St Petersburg, Florida
38. Melancholy – to Marcel Remy in Friendship, Salvador Dalí (1934) Gala-Salvador Dalí Foundation
39. Moment of Transition (1934) Gala-Salvador Dalí Foundation
40. Morning Ossification of the Cypress (1934) Gala-Salvador Dalí Foundation
41. Night Spectre on the Beach (1934) Gala-Salvador Dalí Foundation
42. Omelette about to be Irreparably Crushed by Hands (1934)
43. Omelettes with Dynamic, Mixed Herbs (1934)
44. Paranoiac Astral Image (1934), Wadsworth Atheneum, Hartford, Connecticut Gala-Salvador Dalí Foundation
45. Persistence of Fair Weather (1934) The Dali Museum, St Petersburg, Florida
46. Portrait of Gala with a Lobster (Portrait of Gala with Aeroplane Nose) (1934), Morohashi Museum of Modern Art, Fukushima
47. Portrait of Rene Crevel (Dedicated to Julien Green) (1934)
48. Portrait of Rene Crevel (Man with a Cigarette) (1934)
49. Portrait of a Woman (1934) Gala-Salvador Dalí Foundation
50. Seascape (1934) Gala-Salvador Dalí Foundation
51. The Sense of Speed (1934) Gala-Salvador Dalí Foundation
52. The Ship (1934–35)
53. The Signal of Anguish (1934), National Galleries of Scotland Gala-Salvador Dalí Foundation
54. Skull with Its Lyric Appendage Leaning on a Night Table which Should Have the Exact Temperature of a Cardinal Bird's Nest (1934) The Dali Museum, St Petersburg, Florida
55. The Spectre of Sex Appeal (1934) Dalí Theatre and Museum, Figueres, Spain
56. The Spectre of the Angelus (1934) Gala-Salvador Dalí Foundation
57. Study for "Cardinal, Cardinal!" (1934)
58. Surrealist Furniture. Preparatory Drawing for Singularities (1934–35)
59. Surrealist Knight for a Four-part Screen (1934)
60. Surrealist Knights for a Four-part Screen, Centre Right (1934)
61. Surrealist Poster (1934) The Dali Museum, St Petersburg, Florida
62. Surrealist Warriors for a Four-part Screen, Centre Left (1934)
63. Title Unknown – Ghost (1934)
64. The Tower (1934), Kunsthaus Zürich Gala-Salvador Dalí Foundation
65. Untitled (Desert Landscape) (1934)
66. Untitled (Dreams on the Beach) (1934) Gala-Salvador Dalí Foundation
67. Untitled – Young Girl with a Skull (1934)
68. The Weaning of Furniture-Nutrition (1934) The Dali Museum, St Petersburg, Florida
69. West Side of the Isle of the Dead – Reconstructed Compulsive Image After Böcklin (1934), ABANCA Art collection, A Coruña Gala-Salvador Dalí Foundation

1935

1. The Angelus of Gala (1935) Museum of Modern Art, New York
2. Archaeological Reminiscence of Millet's Angelus (1935) The Dali Museum, St Petersburg, Florida
3. Don Quixote (1935)
4. Drawing for "American Weekly" (1935)
5. The Echo of the Void (1935) Gala-Salvador Dalí Foundation
6. Exquisite Cadaver (1935)
7. The Horseman of Death (1935)
8. Landscape After De Chirico (unfinished) (1935)
9. Mae West's Face which May Be Used as a Surrealist Apartment (1935) Art Institute of Chicago
10. Mediumnistic-Paranoiac Image (1935) Gala-Salvador Dalí Foundation
11. The Nostalgic Echo (1935)
12. Nostalgic Echo (1935, 112 x 112 cm, cat no 433) Gala-Salvador Dalí Foundation
13. Paranoiac Visage (1935) Gala-Salvador Dalí Foundation
14. Paranoiac Visage – The Postcard Transformed (1935)
15. Paranoiac-Critical Solitude (1935) Gala-Salvador Dalí Foundation
16. Paranonia (1935–36) The Dali Museum, St Petersburg, Florida
17. Portrait of Isabelle Baker Woolley (1935), New Mexico Museum of Art, Santa Fe, New Mexico
18. Poster Project (1935)
19. Puzzle of Autumn (1935) The Dali Museum, St Petersburg, Florida
20. Soft Cramas and Skull Harp (1935)
21. Study for "Premonition of Civil War" (1935)
22. Study for "Premonition of Civil War" (1935)
23. Study for "Premonition of Civil War" (1935)
24. Study for "Suburbs of a Paranoiac-Critical Town" (1935)
25. The Surrealist Mystery of New York I (1935)
26. Thought Machine – Illustration for "The Secret Life of Salvador Dalí" (1935)
27. Woman in a Hat Sitting on a Beach. Drawing for "American Weekly" (1935)
28. Woman with a Head of Roses (1935) Kunsthaus Zürich Gala-Salvador Dalí Foundation

1936

1. Ampurdanese Yang and Yin (1936) Gala-Salvador Dalí Foundation
2. Ant Face. Drawing for the Catalogue Jacket of Dalí's Exhibition at the Alex Reid and Lefevre Gallery in London (1936)
3. The Anthropomorphic Cabinet (1936)
4. The Ants (1936–37)
5. Aphrodisiac Dinner Jacket (1936)
6. Aphrodisiac Dinner Jacket (1936)
7. Apparition of the Town of Delft (1936) Gala-Salvador Dalí Foundation
8. Autumnal Cannibalism (1936) Tate Modern, London
9. Beach Scene (detail study) (1936)
10. Blactric Collars (1936)
11. Bread on the Head of the Prodigal Son (1936) Gala-Salvador Dalí Foundation
12. Bust with Drawers (1936)
13. A Chemist Lifting with Extreme Precaution the Cuticle of a Grand Piano (1936) Art Institute of Chicago
14. The City of Drawers (1936)
15. The City of Drawers – Study for the "Anthropomorphic Cabinet" (1936)
16. The City of Drawers – Study for the "Anthropomorphic Cabinet" (1936)
17. Couple with Their Heads Full of Clouds (1936, cat no P 443) Museum Boijmans van Beuningen, Rotterdam (first version)
18. Cover of "Minotaure" Magazine (1936) Gala-Salvador Dalí Foundation
19. Decalcomania (1936)
20. Diurnal Melancoly (1936) Museum Folkwang, Essen Gala-Salvador Dalí Foundation
21. The Dream places a Hand on a Man's Shoulder (1936) Gala-Salvador Dalí Foundation
22. Forgotten Horizon (1936) Tate Modern, London
23. The Fossilized Automobile of Cape Creus (1936), Nahmad collection Gala-Salvador Dalí Foundation
24. Freudian Portrait of a Bureaucrat (1936)
25. Gala's Head – Rear View (1936)
26. Geodesic Portrait of Gala (1936) Yokohama Museum
27. Geological Justice (Anthropomorphism, extra flat) (1936) Gala-Salvador Dalí Foundation
28. The Great Paranoiac (1936) Museum Boijmans van Beuningen, Rotterdam
29. Hands Chair (1936)
30. Head of a Woman in the Form of a Battle (1936) Gala-Salvador Dalí Foundation
31. Hypnagogic Monument (1936) Gala-Salvador Dalí Foundation
32. Landscape with Girl Skipping Rope (1936) Museum Boijmans van Beuningen, Rotterdam
33. Lobster Telephone (object) (1936), Tate Modern, London
34. Mae West's Lips Sofa (1936–37)
35. The Man with the Head of Blue Hortensias (1936) The Dali Museum, St Petersburg, Florida
36. Man with His Head Full of Clouds (1936) Figueres Town Hall Gala-Salvador Dalí Foundation
37. Messenger in a Palladinian Landscape (1936)
38. Morphological Echo (1936, 64 × 54 cm) The Dali Museum, St Petersburg, Florida
39. Morphological Echo (1936, 30 × 33 cm) The Dali Museum, St Petersburg, Florida
40. Necrophiliac Springtime (1936) Gala-Salvador Dalí Foundation
41. Night and Day Clothes (1936)
42. Our Love (1936)
43. The Pharmacist of Ampurdan in Search of Absolutely Nothing (1936)
44. Singularities (Singularitats) (1936)
45. Soft Construction with Boiled Beans (Premonition of Civil War) (1936) Philadelphia Museum of Art, Philadelphia, Pennsylvania
46. South (Noon) (1936)
47. Study for the Cover of "Minotaure", No. (1936)
48. Study for "A Couple with Their Heads Full of Clouds " (detail) (1936)
49. Study for "Geodesic Portrait of Gala" (1936)
50. Study for "Spain" (1936)
51. Study of Horsemen (1936)
52. Suburbs of a Paranoiac-Critical Town: Afternoon on the Outskirts of European History (1936) Gala-Salvador Dalí Foundation
53. Sun Table (1936) Museum Boijmans van Beuningen, Rotterdam
54. Surrealist Composition with Invisible Figures (second version of "Rocks of Llané") (1936) Dalí Theatre and Museum, Figueres, Spain
55. Three Young Surrealistic Women Holding in Their Arms the Skins of an Orchestra (1936) The Dali Museum, St Petersburg, Florida
56. Venus de Milo with Drawers (1936) Art Institute of Chicago
57. Venus De Milo with Drawers (1936)
58. The Vertebrate Grotto – Transfer Series (1936)
59. White Calm (1936) Gala-Salvador Dalí Foundation
60. Woman with Drawers (1936)

1937

1. Anatomical Studies – Transfer Series (1937)
2. Anthropomorphic Echo (1935) The Dali Museum, St Petersburg, Florida
3. Average Pagan Landscape (1937) Gala-Salvador Dalí Foundation
4. Burning Giraffe (1937)
5. The Burning Giraffe (1937), Kunstmuseum Basel Gala-Salvador Dalí Foundation
6. Cannibalism of the Objects (1937)
7. Couple with Their Heads Full of Clouds (1937, 92.5 X 72.5, cat no P 508) Museum of Modern and Contemporary Art of Trento and Rovereto Gala-Salvador Dalí Foundation (second version)
8. Creation of the Monsters (1937)
9. Dinner in the Desert (1937
10. Dinner in the Desert Lighted by Giraffes on Fire (1937)
11. Drawers Cannibalism (Composition with Drawers) (1937)
12. Enchanted Beach (Long, Siphon) (1937) Gala-Salvador Dalí Foundation
13. Herodias (1937)
14. How Skyscrapers Will Look in 1987 (Drawing for "American Weekly") (1937)
15. The Hysterical Arch (1937)
16. Imaginary Portrait of Lautréamont at the Age of Nineteen (1937)
17. Inventions of the Monsters (1937) Art Institute of Chicago
18. Knights of Death (1937)
19. Metamorphosis of Narcissus (1937) Tate Modern, London
20. Palladio's Thalia Corridor (1937), Mie Prefectural Art Museum, Tsu-Shi, Mie-Ken Gala-Salvador Dalí Foundation
21. Perspectives (1937), Kunstmuseum Basel Gala-Salvador Dalí Foundation
22. Portrait of Freud (1937)
23. Queen Salome (1937)
24. Sleep (1937) Gala-Salvador Dalí Foundation
25. Study for "The False Inspection" (False Perspective) (1937)
26. Study for "The Metamorphosis of Narcissus" (1937)
27. Surrealist Dinner on a Bed (Drawing for a Film Project with the Marx Brothers) (1937)
28. Surrealist Gondola Above Burning Bicycles (Drawing for a Film Project with the Marx Brothers) (1937)
29. Swans Reflecting Elephants (1937) Gala-Salvador Dalí Foundation
30. Untitled – Hysterical Scene (1937)
31. Untitled – Lamp with Drawers (Drawing for an interior) (1937)
32. Untitled – Standard Lamp With Crutches (Drawing for an interior) (1937)
33. Untitled – Woman with a Flower Head (1937)
34. Visions of Eternity (1937) Art Institute of Chicago
35. The Woman in Flames (1937)

1938

1. Apparition of the Figure of Vermeer on the Face of Abraham Lincoln. Study for "The Image Disappears" (1938)
2. Apparition of Face and Fruit Dish on a Beach (1938), Wadsworth Atheneum, Hartford, Connecticut Gala-Salvador Dalí Foundation
3. Beach at Cape Creus with Seated Woman Seen from the Back Mending a Sail and Boat (1938)
4. Beach with Telephone (1938)
5. Coccyx Women (1938)
6. Composition – Two Women with a Town in the Background (1938)
7. Debris of an Automobile Giving Birth to a Blind Horse Biting a Telephone (1938) Museum of Modern Art, New York
8. Enchanted Beach with Three Fluid Graces (1938) The Dali Museum, St Petersburg, Florida
9. The Endless Enigma (1938) Museo Nacional Centro de Arte Reina Sofía, Madrid
10. Face of the Great Cyclopean Cretin (1938)
11. Fantastic Beach Scene with Skeleton and Parrot (1938)
12. Gradiva (1938)
13. Greyhound (1938)
14. The Image Disappears (1938) Dalí Theatre and Museum, Figueres, Spain
15. Imaginary Figures with a Background of Spanish Monuments (Study for the Costumes for Coco Chanel) (1938)
16. Imperial Violets (1938) Gala-Salvador Dalí Foundation
17. Impressions of Africa (1938) Museum Boijmans van Beuningen, Rotterdam
18. Invisible Afghan with the Apparition on the Beach of the Face of Garcia Lorca in the Form of a Fruit Dish with Three Figs (1938) Gala-Salvador Dalí Foundation
19. Mandolin, Fruit Dish With Pears, Two Figs on a Table (1938)
20. Melancholic eccentricity. Mountain Lake (1938) Tate Liverpool
21. Mythological Beast (1938)
22. Palladio's Corridor of Dramatic Surprise (1938) Gala-Salvador Dalí Foundation
23. Philosopher Reclining (1938)
24. Portrait of Sigmund Freud (1938)
25. Portrait of Sigmund Freud – Morphology of the Skull of Sigmund Freud. Illustration for "The Secret Life of Salvador Dalí" (1938)
26. Spain (1938) Museum Boijmans van Beuningen, Rotterdam
27. Study for the Self-portrait in "Impressions of Africa" (1938)
28. Study for the Self-portrait in "Impressions of Africa" (1938)
29. Study for The Image Disappears (1938)
30. The Sublime Moment (1938) Entry at the Staatsgalerie Stuttgart
31. The Transparent Simulacrum of the Feigned Image (1938) Albright-Knox Art Gallery, Buffalo, New York
32. Untitled (1938)
33. Untitled – Figure (unfinished) (1938–39)
34. The Warning (1938)

1939

1. Actress Betty Stockfeld is Metamorphosed into a Nurse (1939)
2. Apparition of a War Scene on the Face of Lieutenant Deschanel. Cover of "Match" (1939)
3. Baby Map of the World (1939), Figueres Town Hall Gala-Salvador Dalí Foundation
4. Bacchanale (1939) Gala-Salvador Dalí Foundation
5. Ballerina in a Death's Head (1939), Merz collection Gala-Salvador Dalí Foundation
6. Drawing for "Bacchanale" (1939)
7. The Dream of Venus (1939), Hiroshima Prefectural Art Museum Gala-Salvador Dalí Foundation
8. The Enigma of Hitler (1939), Museo Nacional Centro de Arte Reina Sofía, Madrid
9. Freud's Perverse Polymorph (Bulgarian Child Eating a Rat) (1939)
10. Gradiva Becoming Fruits, Vegetables, Pork, Bread, and Grilled Sardine (1939)
11. Gradiva, She Who Advances (1939)
12. Group of Figures (1939)
13. Landscape with Telephones on a Plate (1939) Gala-Salvador Dalí Foundation
14. Mad Tristan (1939) The Dali Museum, St Petersburg, Florida
15. Masked Mermaid in Black (1939)
16. Metamorphosis of the Five Allegories of Giovanni Bellini (1939)
17. Metamorphosis of a Man's Bust into a Scene Inspired by Vermeer (1939)
18. Metamorphosis of a Man's Bust into a Scene Inspired by Vermeer (1939)
19. Philosopher Illuminated by the Light of the Moon and the Setting Sun (1939) Gala-Salvador Dalí Foundation
20. Portrait of Gala (unfinished; detail) (1939)
21. Portrait of Sigmund Freud from "The Secret Life" (1939)
22. Psychoanalysis and Morphology Meet (1939) Gala-Salvador Dalí Foundation
23. Set for "Bacchanale" (1939)
24. Shirley Temple, The Youngest, Most Sacred Monster of the Cinema in Her Time (1939), Museum Boijmans Van Beuningen, Rotterdam
25. Sirens and Graces – Set Design for Dalí's "Bacchanale" (1939)
26. The Sphere Attacks the Pyramid. Cover of the Catalogue of the Exhibition at Julien Levy's in New York. (1939)
27. Study for Apparition of a Vermeer Figure on Abraham Lincoln's Face (1939)
28. Study for Portrait of Gala (1939)
29. Study for a Ballet Backdrop (1939)
30. Telephone in a Dish With Three Grilled Sardines at the End of September (1939) The Dali Museum, St Petersburg, Florida

=== 1940–1949 ===
1940

1. Allegory of Sunset Air (Allegory of the Evening) (1940–41), Morohashi Museum of Modern Art, Fukushima Gala-Salvador Dalí Foundation
2. Arches with Fruit Bowl. Study for Slave Market with the Appearance of the Invisible Bust of Voltaire (1940)
3. Centaur (The Triumph of Nautilus) (1940)
4. Daddy Longlegs of the Evening... Hope! (1940) The Dali Museum, St Petersburg, Florida
5. Etudes d'Anges (1940)
6. Family of Marsupial Centaurs (1940) Gala-Salvador Dalí Foundation
7. Figures on the Stairs (1940)
8. The Golden Age – Family of Marsupial Centaurs (1940–41)
9. Group of Women Imitating the Gestures of a Schooner (1940) Gala-Salvador Dalí Foundation
10. Lady Louis Mountbatten (1940) Gala-Salvador Dalí Foundation
11. March of Time Committee – Papillon (1940)
12. Old Age, Adolescence, Infancy (The Three Ages) (1940) The Dali Museum, St Petersburg, Florida
13. Perforated House with Fruit Bowl. Study for Slave Market with the Appearance of the Invisible Bust of Voltaire (1940)
14. Slave Market with the Disappearing Bust of Voltaire (1940) The Dali Museum, St Petersburg, Florida
15. Two Pieces of Bread, Expressing the Sentiment of Love (1940) Gala-Salvador Dalí Foundation
16. Untitled (Three Figures and a Cypress) (1940)
17. The Face of War (1940) Museum Boijmans van Beuningen, Rotterdam

1941 (USA)

1. Cafe Scene. The Figures at the Table Make a Skull – Drawing for the Nightmare in "Moontide" (1941)
2. Car Clothing (Clothed Automobile) (1941) Gala-Salvador Dalí Foundation
3. Costume for a Nude with a Codfish Tail (1941)
4. Design for "Labyrinth" (1941) Gala-Salvador Dalí Foundation
5. Design for the Set of "Labyrinth" (1941), Anderson Gallery, University of Buffalo, New York Gala-Salvador Dalí Foundation
6. Drawing for the Glass Hallucination in Hitchcock's Film "Moontide (the House of Dr. Edwards)" (1941)
7. The Eye of Time (1941)
8. The Face of War – Drawing for the Nightmare Scene in the Film "Moontide" (1941)
9. Honey is Sweeter than Blood (1941) The Santa Barbara Museum of Art, Santa Barbara, California
10. Invisible Bust of Voltaire (1941) The Dali Museum, St Petersburg, Florida
11. Jewel (1941)
12. Maquette of the scenery for "Labyrinth" (1941)
13. Mysterious Mouth Appearing in the Back of My Nurse (1941)
14. Original Sin (1941) Gala-Salvador Dalí Foundation
15. Portrait of Gala (1941)
16. Portrait of Gala. Study for "Galarina" (1941)
17. Portrait of Mrs. George Tait, II (1941)
18. Ruin with Head of Medusa and Landscape (1941) Gala-Salvador Dalí Foundation
19. Set of "Tristan and Isolde" (1941)
20. Soft Self-portrait with Fried Bacon (1941) Dalí Theatre and Museum, Figueres, Spain
21. Study for Slave Market with the Appearance of the Invisible Bust of Voltaire (1941)
22. Study for "Original Sin" (1941)
23. Study for "Portrait of Mrs. Georges Tait, II" (1941)
24. Temple – Sketch for a Set Design (1941)
25. The Triumph of Nautilus (1941) Gala-Salvador Dalí Foundation

1942 (USA)

1. Birth of a New World (1942) Gala-Salvador Dalí Foundation
2. Composition (Two Harlequins) (1942) Gala-Salvador Dalí Foundation
3. Decor for "Romeo et Juliet" (1942)
4. Design for the Interior Decoration of a Stable-Library (1942)
5. Design for the set of "Romeo and Juliet" (1942)
6. Design for the set of "Romeo and Juliet" (backdrops and wing flats) (1942)
7. Design for a poster for "The Secret Life of Salvador Dalí" (1942)
8. Divine Couple – Sketch for "Nativity of a New World" (1942)
9. Equestrian Parade (possibly Set Design for "Romeo and Juliet") (1942)
10. The Flames, They Call (1942), Nahmad collection Gala-Salvador Dalí Foundation
11. Juliet's Tomb (1942)
12. Maternite Aux Oiseaux (1942)
13. Melancholy – Portrait of Singer Claire Dux (1942)
14. Mrs. Dorothy Spreckels Munn (1942) Fine Arts Museums of San Francisco
15. Mural Painting for Helena Rubinstein, Dawn (panel ) (1942) Yokohama Museum
16. Mural Painting for Helena Rubinstein, Heroic Noon (panel ) (1942) Yokohama Museum
17. Mural Painting for Helena Rubinstein, Evening (panel ) (1942) Yokohama Museum
18. Nude on the Plain of Rosas (1942) Gala-Salvador Dalí Foundation
19. Portrait of the Marquis De Cuevas (1942) Gala-Salvador Dalí Foundation
20. Portrait of Mrs. Luther Greene (1942)
21. Portrait of Mrs. Ortiz-Linares (1942)
22. Romeo and Juliet Memorial (1942)
23. Saint George and the Dragon (1942) Gala-Salvador Dalí Foundation
24. The Sheep (1942)
25. Study for the campaign against venereal disease: "Soldier Take Warning" (1942)
26. Study for the portrait "Princess Arthchild Gourielli-Helena Rubinstein" (1942–43)
27. Study for the Set of "Labyrinth" – Fighting the Minotaur (1942)
28. Study for the set of "Romeo and Juliet" (1942)
29. The Two on the Cross (1942)
30. Untitled – Design for the Mural Painting for Helena Rubinstein (1942) Gala-Salvador Dalí Foundation
31. Untitled – for the campaign against venereal disease (1942)
32. Untitled – Set Design (Figures Cut in Three) (1942)
33. William Tell Group (1942–43)

1943 (USA)

1. The Broken Egg (Allegory of an American Christmas) (1943), Museum of Modern Art, Toyama Gala-Salvador Dalí Foundation
2. Condottiere (Self-Portrait as Condottiere) (1943)
3. Geopoliticus Child Watching the Birth of the New Man (1943) The Dali Museum, St Petersburg, Florida
4. Le Mendicant (1943)
5. Madonna (1943) Gala-Salvador Dalí Foundation
6. Madonna of the Birds (1943)
7. The Madonna of the Birds with Two Angels (1943)
8. Painting for the backdrop of "Cafe De Chinitas" (1943) Gala-Salvador Dalí Foundation
9. The Poetry of America (unfinished) (1943) Dalí Theatre and Museum, Figueres, Spain
10. Portrait of Ambassador Cardenas (1943) Gala-Salvador Dalí Foundation
11. Portrait of Mrs. Harrison Williams (1943) Gala-Salvador Dalí Foundation
12. Princess Arthchil Gourielli (Helena Rubinstein) (1943) Gala-Salvador Dalí Foundation
13. Saint Sebastian (1943)
14. The Ship (1943)
15. Stage Curtain for the Ballet "Cafe De Chinitas" (1943)
16. Study for "Galarina" (1943)
17. The Triumph of Tourbillon (1943) Gala-Salvador Dalí Foundation
18. Untitled – New Accessoires (1943) Gala-Salvador Dalí Foundation

1944 (USA)

1. Art of Ballet – the Seven Lively Arts (1944) (lost in fire, 1956) Gala-Salvador Dalí Foundation
2. Art of Boogie-Woogie – the Seven Lively Arts (1944) (lost in fire, 1956) Gala-Salvador Dalí Foundation
3. Art of Cinema – the Seven Lively Arts (1944) (lost in fire, 1956) Gala-Salvador Dalí Foundation
4. Art of Concert – The Seven Lively Arts (1944) (lost in fire, 1956) Gala-Salvador Dalí Foundation
5. Art of Opera - The Seven Lively Arts (1944) (lost in fire, 1956) Gala-Salvador Dalí Foundation
6. Art of Radio – the Seven Lively Arts (1944) (lost in fire, 1956) Gala-Salvador Dalí Foundation
7. Art of Theater - The Seven Lively Arts (1944) (lost in fire, 1956) Gala-Salvador Dalí Foundation
8. Dream Caused by the Flight of a Bee Around a Pomegranate a Second Before Awakening (1944) Museo Thyssen-Bornemisza, Madrid
9. Drawing for the dust jacket of "Hidden Faces" (1944)
10. Frontispiece for "Hidden Faces" – I Am the Lady... (1944)
11. Gala Naked. Study for "Dream Caused by the Flight of a Bee..." (1944)
12. Galarina (1944–45)
13. Giant Flying Demi-Tasse with Incomprehensible Appendage Five Meters Long (1944–45) Gala-Salvador Dalí Foundation
14. The God of the Bay of Roses (1944), Virginia Museum of Fine Arts, Richmond, Virginia
15. Leg Composition. Drawing from a series of advertisements for Bryans Hosiery (1944)
16. Mad Tristan (1944) Gala-Salvador Dalí Foundation
17. Monumental Shield for "Hidden Faces" (1944)
18. Paranoia (Surrealist Figures) (1944) Gala-Salvador Dalí Foundation
19. Sentimental Colloquy (Study for a Ballet) (1944) The Dali Museum, St Petersburg, Florida
20. Study for the Backdrop of "Mad Tristan" (Act II) (1944)
21. Study for the set of the ballet "Tristan Insane" (Act ) (1944)
22. Study for "The Apotheosis of Homer" (1944)
23. The Apotheosis of Homer (1944–45), Pinakothek der Moderne, Munich Gala-Salvador Dalí Foundation
24. Tristan and Isolde (1944)
25. "Tristan and Isolde" – study for the set of the ballet "Bacchanale" (1944)
26. "Tristan Insane": Costumes for the Spirits of Death (1944)
27. Untitled – Design for the ball in the dream sequence in "Spellbound" (1944)

1945 (USA)

1. Autumn Sonata (1945) The Dali Museum, St Petersburg, Florida
2. Basket of Bread (1945) Dalí Theatre and Museum, Figueres, Spain
3. The Broken Bridge and the Dream (1945) The Dali Museum, St Petersburg, Florida
4. Design for the Film 'Spellbound' () (1945)
5. Design for the Film 'Spellbound' () (1945)
6. Design for the set of the film "Spellbound" (1945)
7. Don Quixote and the Windmills (1945)
8. Drawing for "Spellbound" (1945)
9. The Eye (1945)
10. Fountain of Milk Spreading Itself Uselessly on Three Shoes (1945) The Dali Museum, St Petersburg, Florida
11. Four Illustrations: Female Figures with Candle (1945)
12. Galarina (1945) Dalí Theatre and Museum, Figueres, Spain
13. Illustration for "The Autobiography of Benvenuto Cellini" (1945)
14. Illustration for "The Autobiography of Benvenuto Cellini" (1945)
15. Illustration for "The Autobiography of Benvenuto Cellini" (1945)
16. Melancholy (1945)
17. My Wife, Naked, Looking at her own Body (1945) Gala-Salvador Dalí Foundation
18. Napoleon's Nose (1945) Gala-Salvador Dalí Foundation
19. Portrait of Mrs. Isabel Styler-Tas (1945), Staatliche Museen zu Berlin Gala-Salvador Dalí Foundation
20. Poster for a Ballet (1945)
21. Resurrection of the Flesh (1945) Gala-Salvador Dalí Foundation
22. Shop Window with Sewing Machine and Umbrella (1945)
23. Spellbound (1945)
24. Study for the dream sequence in "Spellbound" (1945)
25. Study for "Portrait of Mrs. Isabel Styler-Tas" (1945)
26. Three Apparitions of the Visage of Gala (1945) Gala-Salvador Dalí Foundation
27. Untitled – Portrait of a Woman (1945)
28. Untitled – Scene with Marine Allegory (1945)
29. Victory – Woman Metamorphosing into a Boat with Angels (1945)

1946 (USA)

1. Benvenuto Cellini and Jupiter (1946)
2. Christmas (Noel) (1946)
3. Composition – Portrait of Mrs. Eva Kolsman (1946)
4. Desert Trilogy – Flower in the Desert (1946) Gala-Salvador Dalí Foundation
5. Desert Trilogy – Apparition of a Couple in the Desert – for "Desert Flower" perfume (1946) Gala-Salvador Dalí Foundation
6. Desert Trilogy – Apparition of a Woman and Suspended Architecture in the Desert – for "Desert Flower" perfume (1946) National Gallery of Victoria
7. Double Image for "Destino" (1946)
8. Drawing for Disney's "Destino" (1946–47)
9. Madonna (1946)
10. Metamorphose (1946)
11. Nude in the Desert Landscape (1946)
12. One of illustrations for Shakespeare's "Macbeth" (1946)
13. Portrait of Luli Kollsman (1946), Fundación Juan March, Majorca Gala-Salvador Dalí Foundation
14. The Stain (1946)
15. Study for the "Desert" perfume advertisement (1946)
16. The Temptation of Saint Anthony (1946)
17. Untitled (Spanish Dances in a Landscape) (1946)

1947 (USA)

1. The Annunciation (1947)
2. Battle Around a Dandelion (1947) Gala-Salvador Dalí Foundation
3. Cathedral of Thumbs (The Thumbs) (1947)
4. Dematerialization Near the Nose of Nero (1947) Dalí Theatre and Museum, Figueres, Spain
5. Design for "Destino" (1947)
6. Design for "Destino" (1947)
7. Drawing for Secrets of Magic Craftsmanship (501947)
8. Feather Equilibrium (Interatomic Balance of a Swan's Feather) (1947) Gala-Salvador Dalí Foundation
9. Hollywood (1947)
10. Hollywood, cover illustration for Sunset magazine (1947)
11. The Impossible Model (drawing for " Secrets of Magic Craftsmanship") (1947)
12. Jour de la Vierge (1947)
13. Portrait of Pablo Picasso in the 21st Century (1947) Dalí Theatre and Museum, Figueres, Spain
14. Rock and Infuriated Horse Sleeping Under the Sea (1947) Gala-Salvador Dalí Foundation
15. Studies for the air centers and soft morphologies of "Leda Atomica" (1947)
16. Study for Dematerialization of the Nose of Nero (1947)
17. Study for Leda Atomica (1947)
18. Study for "Leda Atomica" (1947)
19. The Three Sphinxes of Bikini (1947) Morohashi Museum of Modern Art, Fukushima
20. Untitled (Landscape) (1947), Morohashi Museum of Modern Art, Fukushima Gala-Salvador Dalí Foundation
21. Untitled (Temple Frontage with Atomic Explosions) (1947)
22. Wheat Ear (1947) Gala-Salvador Dalí Foundation

1948

1. Drawing for the programme for the ballet As You Like It after Shakespeare's comedy (1948)
2. The Elephants (1948)
3. Leda Atomica (first unfinished version) (1948) Gala-Salvador Dalí Foundation
4. Portrait of Mrs Enid Haldorn (1948) Fine Arts Museums of San Francisco
5. Portrait of Mrs. Mary Sigall (1948) Gala-Salvador Dalí Foundation
6. Portrait of Nada Pachevich (1948) Gala-Salvador Dalí Foundation
7. Study for a Portrait (unfinished) (1948)
8. Project for As You Like it (1948) Gala-Salvador Dalí Foundation
9. Project for As You Like it (1948) Gala-Salvador Dalí Foundation
10. Untitled (Landscape) (1948)
11. Untitled (Male Nude in a Landscape) (1948) Gala-Salvador Dalí Foundation
12. Untitled – Illustration for "Secrets of Magic Craftsmanship" (1948)

1949

1. Four Armchairs in the Sky (1949)
2. Future Martyr of Supersonic Waves (1949–50)
3. "La Turbie" – Sir James Dunn Seated (1949), Beaverbrook Art Gallery, Fredericton, New Brunswick Gala-Salvador Dalí Foundation
4. Lago di Garda (1949)
5. Leda Atomica (1949) Dalí Theatre and Museum, Figueres, Spain
6. The Madonna of Port Lligat (first version) (1949), Haggerty Museum of Art, Marquette University, Milwaukee, Wisconsin Gala-Salvador Dalí Foundation
7. May (1949)
8. Naples (1949)
9. Rome (1949)
10. Set designs for the ballet Los Sacos Del Molinero (1949)
11. Study for The Madonna of Port Lligat (1949)

=== 1950–1959 ===
==== 1950 ====
1. Angel (Study) (1950)
2. Ascent into the Sky (1950)
3. Backdrop for Don Juan Tenorio (1950)
4. Carnation and Cloth of Gold (1950) Gala-Salvador Dalí Foundation
5. Christ in Perspective (1950)
6. Piece of Cork (study for The Madonna of Port Lligat) (1950) Museo Nacional Centro de Arte Reina Sofía, Madrid
7. The Creation of Eve – Gaining Twofold Living Nature from the Sleep of Man (1950)
8. Dalí at the Age of Six when he Thought he wes a Girl (1950) Gala-Salvador Dalí Foundation
9. Dalí's Moustache (1950)
10. Design for the death scene in Don Juan Tenorio (1950) Museo Nacional Centro de Arte Reina Sofía, Madrid
11. Erotic Beach (1950), Pérez Simón collection, Mexico Gala-Salvador Dalí Foundation
12. The Judgement of Paris (1950)
13. Kneeling Figure (Microphysical Phosphenes) (1950–51)
14. Landscape of Port Lligat (1950) The Dali Museum, St Petersburg, Florida
15. Landscape of Port Lligat with Homely Angels and Fisherman (1950) Gala-Salvador Dalí Foundation
16. The Madonna of Port Lligat (detail) (1950)
17. The Madonna of Port Lligat (second version) (1950), Fukuoka Art Museum, Japan Gala-Salvador Dalí Foundation
18. Metamorphosis and Dynamic Disintegration of a Cuttlefish Bone Becoming Gala (study for The Madonna of Port Lligat) (1950)
19. Mystical Carnation (1950–51)
20. Portrait of Josephine Hartfort Bryce (1950) Gala-Salvador Dalí Foundation
21. Rhinoceros Disintegrating (1950)
22. The Soft Watch (1950)
23. Study after "Madonna and Child" by Piero Della Francesca for "The Madonna of Port Lligat" (1950)
24. Study for the child in "The Madonna of Port Lligat" (1950)
25. Study for the drapery in "The Madonna of Port Lligat" (1950)
26. Study for a Backdrop (1950)
27. Study for head of "Madonna of Port Lligat" (1950)
28. Study for "Myself at the Age of Six..." (1950)

==== 1951 ====
1. Celestial Coronation (1951)
2. Cerberus, illustration for Dante's Divine Comedy (1951)
3. Christ of Saint John of the Cross (1951), Kelvingrove Art Gallery and Museum, Glasgow Gala-Salvador Dalí Foundation
4. Cosmic Contemplation (1951)
5. Dante (1951)
6. Exploding Flower (1951)
7. Explosive Madonna (1951)
8. The Fallen Angel, illustration for Dante's Divine Comedy (1951)
9. The Followers of Simon, illustration for Dante's Divine Comedy (1951)
10. Human Skull Consisting of Seven Naked Women's Bodies (1951)
11. Illustration for Dante's Divine Comedy (1951)
12. Landscape with Cavalier and Gala (1951)
13. A Logician Devil – Lucifer. Illustration for Dante's "Divine Comedy" (1951)
14. Portrait of a Child (unfinished) (1951)
15. Portrait of Colonel Jack Warner (1951) Syracuse University Art Collection, Syracuse, New York
16. Portrait of Katharina Cornell (1951)
17. Portrait of Mrs. Jack Warner (1951), Morohashi Museum of Modern Art, Fukushima Gala-Salvador Dalí Foundation
18. The Queen of the Butterflies (1951)
19. Raphaelesque Head Exploding (1951, 43.2 x 33.1, cat no P 661), National Galleries of Scotland Gala-Salvador Dalí Foundation
20. Raphaelesque Head Exploding (1951)
21. Study for "Christ of St. John of the Cross" (1951)
22. Untitled (Ants and Wheat Ear) (1951)
23. The Wheelbarrows (1951)

==== 1952 ====
1. The Angel of Port Lligat (1952, 59.8 x 77.5 cm, cat no P 677) The Dali Museum, St Petersburg, Florida
2. The Angel of Port Lligat (1952, cat no P 675) Gala-Salvador Dalí Foundation
3. Arithmosophic Cross (1952) Gala-Salvador Dalí Foundation
4. Assumpta Corpuscularia Lapislazulina (1952) Masaveu collection, Oviedo Gala-Salvador Dalí Foundation
5. The Disintegration of the Persistence of Memory (1952–54) The Dali Museum, St Petersburg, Florida
6. Equestrian Molecular Figure (1952)
7. Eucharistic Still Life (1952) The Dali Museum, St Petersburg, Florida
8. Exploding Head (1952)
9. Foreshortening of Gala (1952)
10. Gala Placida (1952)
11. Galatea of the Spheres (1952) Dalí Theatre and Museum, Figueres, Spain
12. Head of a Gray Angel (1952–54)
13. Madonna in Particles (1952)
14. Madonna in Particles (1952)
15. Nuclear Cross (1952) Gala-Salvador Dalí Foundation
16. Nuclear Head of an Angel (1952)
17. Opposition (1952)
18. Portrait of Berthe David-Weill (1952), Metropolitan Museum of Art, New York Gala-Salvador Dalí Foundation
19. Raphaelesque Dynamics (1952)
20. Study for the Head of the Virgin (1952)
21. The Tree (1952)

==== 1953 ====
1. Costume designs for Le Ballet Des Vendangeurs (The Grape Pickers' Ballet) (1953)
2. Costume designs for Le Ballet Des Vendangeurs (The Grape Pickers' Ballet) (1953)
3. Costume designs for Le Ballet Des Vendangeurs (The Grape Pickers' Ballet) (1953)
4. Dalí's design for a fashion contest under the Theme "The Woman of the Future" (1953)
5. Portrait of Mrs. Eric Phillips (1953) Gala-Salvador Dalí Foundation
6. The Grape Pickers: Bacchus's Chariot (1953)
7. The Royal Heart (1953)
8. Tortoise for "Le Ballet Des Vendangeurs" (1953)

==== 1954 ====
1. The Angel Cross (1954)
2. Anthropomorphic Figure (1954)
3. The Colossus of Rhodes (1954), Kunstmuseum Bern, Switzerland Gala-Salvador Dalí Foundation
4. Crucifixion (1954)
5. Crucifixion ('Corpus Hypercubus') (1954) Metropolitan Museum of Art, New York
6. Dalí Nude (1954) Gala-Salvador Dalí Foundation
7. Equestrian Fantasy – Portrait of Lady Dunn (1954), Beaverbrook Art Gallery, Fredericton, New Brunswick Gala-Salvador Dalí Foundation
8. Gala Contemplating the Corpus Hypercubus (1954) Gala-Salvador Dalí Foundation
9. Galatea in Creation (1954), Anne Vanommeslaghe Gala-Salvador Dalí Foundation
10. Head Bombarded with Grains of Wheat (Particle Head Over the Village of Cadaqués) (1954) Gala-Salvador Dalí Foundation
11. Le Papillon au Rocher (1954)
12. The Lighthouse at Alexandria (1954, 17.9 x 12 cm, cat. no. P 690) Gala-Salvador Dalí Foundation
13. Lighthouse at Alexandria (1954, 41.9 x 38.1 cm, cat. no. P 691) Gala-Salvador Dalí Foundation
14. Madonna and Particle Child (Nuclear Drawing) (1954)
15. The Maximum Speed of Raphael's Madonna (1954) Museo Nacional Centro de Arte Reina Sofía, Madrid
16. Microphysical Madonna (1954) Gala-Salvador Dalí Foundation
17. Noon (Barracks of Port Lligat) (1954) The Dali Museum, St Petersburg, Florida
18. Portrait of Gala with Rhinocerotic Symptoms (1954) Gala-Salvador Dalí Foundation
19. Portrait of Mrs. Ann Woodward (1954), Morohashi Museum of Modern Art, Fukushima Gala-Salvador Dalí Foundation
20. Portrait of Mrs. James Reeves (1954) Gala-Salvador Dalí Foundation
21. Rhinocerotic Disintegration of Illissus of Phidias (Creation of Man) (1954) Gala-Salvador Dalí Foundation
22. Roman Cavalier in Spain (1954)
23. Seven Flies and a Model (1954)
24. A Shower of Jasmine (1954) Gala-Salvador Dalí Foundation
25. Sketch for "Soft Watch, Exploding into Pieces after Twenty Years of Complete Motionlessness" (8881954)
26. Soft Watch at the Moment of First Explosion (1954) Gala-Salvador Dalí Foundation
27. Statue of Olympian Zeus (1954), Morohashi Museum of Modern Art, Fukushima Gala-Salvador Dalí Foundation
28. Symphony in Reds and 'Pings' (1954) Gala-Salvador Dalí Foundation
29. The Temple of Diana at Ephesus (1954) Gala-Salvador Dalí Foundation
30. Two Adolescents (1954) The Dali Museum, St Petersburg, Florida
31. The Walls of Babylon (1954, 27.7 x 76.8 cm, cat. no. P 692) Gala-Salvador Dalí Foundation
32. Young Virgin Auto-Sodomized by the Horns of Her Own Chastity (1954) Gala-Salvador Dalí Foundation

==== 1955 ====
1. The Ascension of Saint Cecilia (1955) Gala-Salvador Dalí Foundation
2. Blue Horns. Design for a Scarf (1955)
3. Combat (Microphysical Warriors) (1955)
4. Illustration for "Tres Picos" (1955)
5. The Lacemaker (copy of the painting by Vermeer Van Delft) (1955), Metropolitan Museum of Art, New York Gala-Salvador Dalí Foundation
6. The Mausoleum of Halicarnassus (1955)
7. Paranoiac-Critical Study of Vermeer's 'Lacemaker' (1955) Solomon R. Guggenheim Museum, New York Gala-Salvador Dalí Foundation
8. Portrait of Dolores Suero Falla Gala-Salvador Dalí Foundation
9. Portrait of Laurence Olivier in the Role of Richard III (1955) Dalí Theatre and Museum, Figueres, Spain
10. The Rhinoceros Dressed on Lace (1955)
11. The Rhinoceros Dressed on Lace (detail) (1955)
12. Rhinocerotic Bust of Vermeer's "Lacemaker" (1955)
13. Rhinocerotic Figures (1955)
14. Rhinocerotic Portrait of Vermeer's "Lacemaker" (1955)
15. The Sacrament of the Last Supper (1955) National Gallery of Art, Washington
16. Study for The Last Supper (1955)
17. Two Disciples (Study for "Sacrament of the Last Supper") (1955)
18. Untitled (The Amazing Adventure of Vermeer's "Lacemaker") (1955)
19. Walls of Babylon (1955, 27.4 x 77.2 cm, cat. no. P 1148) Gala-Salvador Dalí Foundation

==== 1956 ====
1. Anti-Protonic Assumption (1956), Morohashi Museum of Modern Art, Fukushima Gala-Salvador Dalí Foundation
2. Assumpta Canaveral (1956)
3. Don Quixote (1956–57)
4. Don Quixote (1956–57)
5. Don Quixote (1956–57)
6. Don Quixote (1956–57)
7. Fancy Costumes (1956)
8. The Infant Jesus (1956)
9. Landscape at Portlligat with Approaching Storm (1956) Gala-Salvador Dalí Foundation
10. The Motionless Swallow. Study for "Still Life – Fast Moving" (1956) Gala-Salvador Dalí Foundation
11. Nature Morte Vivante (Living Still Life) (1956) The Dali Museum, St Petersburg, Florida
12. Nude Vibrations Dematerializing a Clothed Nude of Super-nude Vibrations (1956), Art Hispania, S. L., Barcelona Gala-Salvador Dalí Foundation
13. Rhinocerotic Gooseflesh (1956) Gala-Salvador Dalí Foundation
14. Saint Surrounded by Three Pi-Mesons (1956) Gala-Salvador Dalí Foundation
15. The Skull of Zurbarán (1956) Hirshhorn Museum and Sculpture Garden, Washington D.C.
16. St. Helena at Port Lligat (1956) The Dali Museum, St Petersburg, Florida
17. Study for a fruit bowl in Still Life – Fast Moving (1956)
18. Study for Nature Morte Vivante (1956)
19. Untitled (Landscape with Butterflies) (1956)
20. Vase of Flowers (1956)
21. Wine Glass and Boat (1956)

==== 1957 ====
1. Bewitchment (Tragedy and Comedy - The Seven Lively Arts) (1957) Gala-Salvador Dalí Foundation
2. Butterfly Landscape (The Great Masturbator in a Surrealist Landscape with D.N.A.) (1957–58)
3. Celestial Ride (Sports - The Seven Lively Arts) (1957) Gala-Salvador Dalí Foundation
4. The Duke of Urbino (Portrait of Count Theo Rossi Di Montelera) (1957) Gala-Salvador Dalí Foundation
5. The Golden Age (Don Quixote) (1957)
6. The Grand Opera (Opera - The Seven Lively Arts) (1957) Gala-Salvador Dalí Foundation
7. Metamorphosed Women (Ballet - The Seven Lively Arts) Gala-Salvador Dalí Foundation
8. Modern Rhapsody (Television - Communications – The Seven Lively Arts) (1957) Gala-Salvador Dalí Foundation
9. The Pyramids (1957), Fundación AMYC, Madrid Gala-Salvador Dalí Foundation
10. Red Orchestra (Music - The Seven Lively Arts) (1957), Nahmad collection Gala-Salvador Dalí Foundation
11. Rock 'n Roll (Dancing - The Seven Lively Arts) (1957), Morohashi Museum of Modern Art, Fukushima Gala-Salvador Dalí Foundation
12. Saint John (1957)
13. Santiago El Grande (St James the Great) (1957), Beaverbrook Art Gallery, Fredericton, New Brunswick Gala-Salvador Dalí Foundation
14. Swallow (1957)
15. Untitled (Surrealist Landscape) (1957–58)
16. Une femme (1957–58)

==== 1958 ====
1. Allegorical Saint and Angels in Adoration of the Holy Spirit (1958)
2. Angel (1958)
3. Pieta. Ascension (1958), Pérez Simón collection, Mexico Gala-Salvador Dalí Foundation
4. The Ascension of Christ (1958)
5. Christ. From "The Apocalypse of St. John" (1958)
6. Clown for "The Amazing Adventure of the Lacemaker and the Rhinoceros" (1958)
7. Cosmic Madonna (1958)
8. Cover of "The Apocalypse of St. John" (1958)
9. Detail from "Moonlit Landscape with Accompaniment" (1958)
10. Dionysus Spitting the Complete Image of Cadaqués on the Tip of the Tongue of a Three-Storied Gaudinian Woman (1958–60) The Dali Museum, St Petersburg, Florida
11. The Discovery of America by Christopher Columbus (1958–59) The Dali Museum, St Petersburg, Florida
12. Landscape of Port Lligat (1958) Gala-Salvador Dalí Foundation
13. Logical Rapprochment of a Trouser Button and a Pair of Cherries (1958)
14. Madonna (1958) Metropolitan Museum of Art, New York
15. Meditative Rose (1958) Gala-Salvador Dalí Foundation
16. Metamorphosis of Hitler's Face into a Moonlit Landscape with Accompaniment (1958)
17. PI-Mesonic Angel (1958)
18. The Pope's Ear (1958)
19. Portrait of Arthur Clarke Herrington (1958) Gala-Salvador Dalí Foundation
20. Portrait of Chester Dale and His Dog Coco (1958) National Gallery of Art, Washington
21. Portrait of C.Z. Guest (1958) Gala-Salvador Dalí Foundation
22. Portrait of Sir James Dunn (1958), Beaverbrook Art Gallery, Fredericton, New Brunswick Gala-Salvador Dalí Foundation
23. Portrait of John Langeloth Loeb, Sr. (1958) Gala-Salvador Dalí Foundation
24. Portrait of an Unidentified Man (1958) Gala-Salvador Dalí Foundation
25. Radiolaire Skeleton. Illustration for " Secrets of Magic Craftsmanship" (501958)
26. Religious Scene in Particles (1958)
27. The Sistine Madonna (1958)
28. The Sistine Madonna (detail) (1958)
29. Study for The Discovery of America by Christopher Columbus (1958)
30. Velazquez Painting the Infanta Margarita with the Lights and Shadows of His Own Glory (1958) The Dali Museum, St Petersburg, Florida

==== 1959 ====
1. Christ on a Pebble (1959)
2. Leda's Swan (1959)
3. Of the Very Monarchical Education of the Young (1959)
4. Illustration for McCalls Magazine (1959) Gala-Salvador Dalí Foundation
5. Pieta. From "The Apocalypse of St. John" (1959)
6. Port Lligat at Sunset (1959) Gala-Salvador Dalí Foundation
7. Portrait of Reinaldo Herrera, Marquis De Torre Casa (1959) Gala-Salvador Dalí Foundation
8. Study for Woman Undressing (1959)
9. The Vase of Cornflowers (1959)
10. The Virgin of Guadalupe (1959) Gala-Salvador Dalí Foundation
11. Woman Undressing (1959) Gala-Salvador Dalí Foundation

=== 1960–1969 ===
==== 1960 ====
1. The Apocalypse of Saint John (1960)
2. Arabs. Study for "The Battle of Tetuan" (1960)
3. Beatrice (1960)
4. Birth of a Divinity (1960)
5. Birth of a Goddess (1960) Gala-Salvador Dalí Foundation
6. Cathedral (unfinished) (1960)
7. Chair with the Wings of a Vulture (1960)
8. The Cosmic Athlete (1960)
9. The Ecumenical Council (1960, 299.7 x 254 cm) The Dali Museum, St Petersburg, Florida
10. A Fate of the Parthenon (1960)
11. Female Seated Nude (1960)
12. Figure In the Shape of a Cloud (1960)
13. Gala Nude From Behind Looking in an Invisible Mirror (1960)
14. Goddess Leaning on her Elbow (1960), Generalitat de Catalunya Gala-Salvador Dalí Foundation
15. Hyperxiological Sky (1960) Gala-Salvador Dalí Foundation
16. The Life of Mary Magdalene (1960) https://www.salvador-dali.org/en/artwork/catalogue-raisonne-paintings/colleccions/private-collection/760/mary-magdalene Gala-Salvador Dalí Foundation]
17. Madonna (1960)
18. The Maids-in-Waiting (Las Meninas) (1960), Nahmad collection Gala-Salvador Dalí Foundation
19. The Maids-in-Waiting (Las Meninas; detail) (1960)
20. Portrait of "Bobo" Rockefeller (unfinished) (1960)
21. Portrait of Countess Ghislaine d'Oultremont (1960)
22. Portrait of Juan de Pareja Repairing a String of His Mandolin (1960), The Minneapolis Institute of Arts Gala-Salvador Dalí Foundation
23. Portrait of a Man (They Were There) (1960)
24. Portrait of Mildred Fagen (1960), Artium Centre, Museo Vasco de Arte Contemporáneo, Vitoria-Gasteiz, Álava Gala-Salvador Dalí Foundation
25. Portrait of St. Jerome (1960) Dalí Theatre and Museum, Figueres, Spain
26. A Propos of the "Treatise on Cubic Form" by Juan de Herrera (1960) Museo Nacional Centro de Arte Reina Sofía, Madrid
27. Saint Anne and the Infant (1960)
28. Saint Anne and Saint John (1960)
29. San Salvador and Antonio Gaudi Fighting for the Crown of the Virgin (1960)
30. The Servant of the Disciples at Emmaus (1960) Gala-Salvador Dalí Foundation
31. Six Figures (1960)
32. The Space Elephant (1960)
33. St. Peter's in Rome (Explosion of Mystical Faith in the Midst of a Cathedral) (unfinished) (1960)
34. The Trinity (Study for "The Ecumenical Council") (1960), Vatican Museums Gala-Salvador Dalí Foundation
35. Two Religious Figures (1960)
36. Untitled (1960)
37. Untitled (The Lady of Avignon) (1960)

==== 1961 ====
1. El triomf i el rodolí de la Gala i en Dalí (1961, auca)
2. Arabs. Study for The Battle of Tetuan (1961)
3. The Battle of Tetuan (1961–62) Morohashi Museum of Modern Art, Fukushima
4. The Infanta (Standing Woman) (1961)
5. Leda's Swan (Leda and the Swan) (1961)
6. Mohammed's Dream (Homage to Fortuny) (1961), Pierre Schumberger collection Gala-Salvador Dalí Foundation
7. Portrait of Ruth Lachman (1961) Gala-Salvador Dalí Foundation
8. Portrait of a Woman – Grey Jacket Wearing a Pearl Necklace (1961)
9. Study for The Battle of Tetuan (1961)
10. Study for The Battle of Tetuan (1961)

==== 1962 ====
1. The Alchemist (1962)
2. Arab (1962)
3. Arab (1962)
4. Cristo del Vallés (Christ of Vallés) (1962) Gala-Salvador Dalí Foundation
5. Macrophotographic Self-Portrait with the Appearance of Gala (1962)
6. Macrophotographic Self-Portrait with the Appearance of Gala (detail) (1962)
7. Medusa's Head (1962)
8. Portrait of Abel E. Fagen (1962) Gala-Salvador Dalí Foundation
9. The Sacred Heart of Jesus (1962) Gala-Salvador Dalí Foundation
10. St. George (1962) Gala-Salvador Dalí Foundation
11. Study for The Battle of Tetuan (1962)
12. Study of a Female Nude (1962)
13. Twist in the Studio of Velazquez (1962) Gala-Salvador Dalí Foundation
14. Vision of Fátima (1962)

==== 1963 ====
1. Arabs – the Death of Raimundus Lullus (1963)
2. Arabs – the Death of Raymond Lulle (1963)
3. Desoxyribonucleic Acid Arabs (1963)
4. D'Artagnan (1963)
5. Fifty Abstract Paintings Which as Seen from Two Yards Change into Three Lenins Masquerading as Chinese and as Seen from Six Yards Appear as the Head of a Royal Bengal Tiger (1963) Dalí Theatre and Museum, Figueres, Spain
6. Galacidalacidesoxyribonucleicacid (1963) The Dali Museum, St Petersburg, Florida
7. Hercules Lifting the Skin of the Sea Stops Venus for an Instant from Waking Love (1963), Nagasaki Prefectural Art Museum, Nagasaki Gala-Salvador Dalí Foundation
8. The Judgement of Paris (1963)
9. Madonna with a Mystical Rose (1963), Fundación María José Jove Art Collection, A Coruña Gala-Salvador Dalí Foundation
10. Mohammed's Dream (1963)
11. Portrait of My Dead Brother (1963) The Dali Museum, St Petersburg, Florida
12. Portrait of Jonathan and Ann Green (1963) Gala-Salvador Dalí Foundation
13. Portrait of Sara Maria Larrabure (1963) Gala-Salvador Dalí Foundation
14. Religious Scene (1963)
15. Study for Deoxyribonucleic Acid Arabs (1963)
16. Study for Deoxyribonucleic Acid Arabs (1963)
17. Study for Fifty Abstract Pictures Which as Seen from Two Yards Change into Three Lenins Masquerading as Chinese and as Seen From Six Yards Appear as the Head of a Royal Bengal Tiger'' (1963)
18. Untitled (Still Life with Lilies) (1963)
19. Femme nue (1963)

==== 1964 ====
1. Briggs Family Portrait (1964) Gala-Salvador Dalí Foundation
2. Bust of Dante (1964)
3. The Dream of Ezechiel (1964)
4. Female Nude (after restoration) (1964)
5. Landscape with Flies (1964)
6. Madonna with a Rose (1964)
7. Portrait of Mon Ling Yu Landegger Gala-Salvador Dalí Foundation
8. Untitled (St. John) (1964)
9. Untitled. Female Nude on a Palette (1964)
10. Venus with Drawers (Bronze statue) (1964) Dalí Theatre and Museum, Figueres, Spain
11. Venus' Otorhinologic Head (1964)

==== 1965 ====
1. The Anatomy Lesson (1965)
2. Apotheosis of the Dollar (1965) Dalí Theatre and Museum, Figueres, Spain
3. Barcelona. Beachwear Design (1965)
4. The Chalice of Life (1965)
5. "Character Masquerading in Pinning Up a Butterfly" (1965)
6. Coming Back. Design for a Beach Two-piece (1965)
7. Crucifixion (Dedication: For Gala Queen of the Divine Dalí) (1965)
8. Dalínian Empire. Design for a Summer Cocktail Dress (1965)
9. The Duke D'Olivares (1965)
10. Extra Flat. Design for a Bikini (1965)
11. Fifty-Fifty. Swimsuit Design (1965)
12. Homage to Meirronier (1965)
13. Homage to Millet (1965)
14. Laocoon Tormented by Flies (1965)
15. Michelin's Slave – Can Be Used as a Car (1965)
16. Night in the Hotel (Abstract in Black and White) (1965)
17. Nude on Pedestal from Rear (1965) Gala-Salvador Dalí Foundation
18. Nude on Pedestal from Front (1965) Gala-Salvador Dalí Foundation
19. Odalisque by a Bath (Harem Scene) (1965)
20. Odalísque. Design for a Summer Evening Dress (1965)
21. Philipp II Taking Communion (1965)
22. Portrait of Gala (Gala Against the Light) (1965)
23. Portrait of Lammot du Pont Copeland (1965) Gala-Salvador Dalí Foundation
24. Portrait of Mrs. Ruth Daponte (1965) Gala-Salvador Dalí Foundation
25. Portrait of São Schlumberger (1965) Gala-Salvador Dalí Foundation
26. The Railway Station at Perpignan (1965) Museum Ludwig, Cologne
27. Salvador Dalí in the Act of Painting Gala in the Apotheosis of the Dollar (1965)
28. The Sun of Dalí (1965), Okazaki City Museum, Japan Gala-Salvador Dalí Foundation
29. Tennis. Design for a Tennis Dress (1965)
30. Thirst (1965)
31. Untitled (Apocalyptic Christ: Christ with Flames) (1965)
32. Untitled (St. John from Behind) (1965)
33. Yellow Astronaut (clerical). Design for a Summer Evening Dress (1965)

==== 1966–67 ====
1. Large Figure for "Tuna Fishing" (1966–67)
2. Large Figure for "Tuna Fishing" (1966–67)
3. Moses and the Pharaoh (1966) Syracuse University Art Collection, Syracuse, New York
4. The Progress of "Tuna Fishing" (1966–67)
5. Study for Tuna Fishing (1966–67)
6. Study for Tuna Fishing (1966–67)
7. Study for Tuna Fishing (1966–67)
8. Tuna Fishing (advanced State) (1966–67)
9. Tuna Fishing (advanced State) (1966–67)
10. Tuna Fishing (advanced State) (1966–67)
11. Untitled (Erotic Scene with Seven Figures) (1966)
12. Ashtray (1967)
13. Dalí-Flower (1967)
14. Figure Climbing a Stair (1967)
15. The Flower Show – Carnation (1967)
16. Gala (1967)
17. The Mountains of Cap Creus on the March (1967)
18. One of graphics for "Dalí illustre Casanova" (Dalí Illustrates Casanova) (1967)
19. Portrait of Eunice Gardiner (1967) Gala-Salvador Dalí Foundation
20. Swan-Elephant and Serpent – Can Be Used as an Ashtray (1967)
21. Tuna Fishing (1967)
22. Le Voyageur (1967)

==== 1968 ====
1. Cyclops (1968)
2. Fisherman of Port Lligat Mending His Net (1968) Gala-Salvador Dalí Foundation
3. The Hallucinogenic Toreador (1968–70) The Dali Museum, St Petersburg, Florida
4. L'Important C'est la Rose (1968)
5. Light and Shadow (1968)
6. Mad Mad Mad Minerva – Illustration for "Memories of Surrealism" (1968)
7. The Patio of Port Lligat (1968)
8. Sketch for The Hallucinogenic Toreador (1968)
9. Study for the Toreador's Face in The Hallucinogenic Toreador. The Likeness Suggests That It Could Well Have Become Gala's Face (1968)
10. Study for Cosmic Athlete (1968), National Heritage Gala-Salvador Dalí Foundation
11. Study of Flies for The Hallucinogenic Toreador (1968)
12. Tauromachia I – The Torero, the Kill (third and final round of the bullfight) (1968)

==== 1969 ====
1. Debris Christ (1969)
2. Emblem of Wounded Pride (1969)
3. Hour of the Monarchy (1969) Barcelona Town Hall Gala-Salvador Dalí Foundation
4. Pimp (1969)
5. The Pool of Tears. Illustration for "Alice in Wonderland" by Lewis Carroll in an Edition Published by Maecenas Press, New York (1969)
6. Study of a Male Nude – Saint Sebastian (1969)
7. The Swimming Pool in Port Lligat (1969–70)
8. Tap (Grill) (1969)
9. Torero Noir (1969)
10. Untitled (Still Life with White Cloth) (1969)
11. Untitled (Surrealist Angel) (1969)

=== 1970–1979 ===
==== 1970 ====
1. Angel of Victory (1970)
2. Apparition of Venus (1970)
3. Christ (1970)
4. The Dalinian Senyera (Catalonian National Flag) (1970)
5. Death Mask of Napoleon (1970)
6. Death Mask of Napoleon (1970)
7. Death Mask of Napoleon – Can Be Used as a Cover for a Rhinoceros (1970)
8. Hannibal Crossing the Alps (1970)
9. Hannibal Crossing the Alps (1970)
10. The Horseman of the Apocalypse (1970)
11. Les Demoiselles D'Avignon (The Girls of Avignon) (1970)
12. Nude Figures at Cape Creus (1970)
13. Op Rhinoceros (1970)
14. Otorhinological Head of Venus (1970)
15. Otorhinological Head of Venus (1970)
16. Patient Lovers (Apparition of a Stereoscopic Face in the Ampurdan Landscape) (1970)
17. Portrait of John Theodoracopoulos (1970)
18. Portrait of Picasso (I Too Have Known the Emperor) (1970)
19. Project for a Swimming Pool in Pubol (1970)
20. Roger Freeing Angelica (St. George and the Damsel) (1970)
21. Silhouette of a Tightrope Walker and Clown (1970)
22. Sketch for a Ceiling of the Teatro-Museo Dalí (1970)
23. Study for the Decoration of the Ceiling in Pubol (1970)
24. Untitled (Michelangelo Head with Drawers) (1970)
25. Winged Victory (1970)

==== 1971 ====
1. The Banker (series of eleven gouaches on different professions) (1971)
2. Caligula's Horse (Dalí's Horses) (1971)
3. Ceiling of the Hall of Gala's Chateau at Pubol (1971)
4. The Christian Knight (Dalí's Horses) (1971)
5. Clauilegnio – The Flaming Horse (Dalí's Horses) (1971)
6. Dalí as a Child with His Father (1971)
7. Design for the Pool at Port Lligat (1971)
8. Doctor, Doctor (1971)
9. Figure with Flag. Illustration for "Memories of Surrealism" (1971)
10. Lady Godiva (Dalí's Horses) (1971)
11. Le Char d'Or (1971)
12. Now It Is Evening (Amazon) (1971)
13. The Second Coming of Christ (1971)
14. The Second Coming of Christ (1971)
15. View of Pubol (1971)
16. View of Pubol (1971)

==== 1972 ====
1. "Dalí" Palette. Frontispiece for the outline of "The Key Dalí Paintings" (1972)
2. The Daughter of the West Wind (1972)
3. The Face (1972)
4. Gala's Dream (Dream of Paradise) (1972)
5. Marilyn Monroe (1972)
6. Object for Gala (1972)
7. Overture in Trompe l'Oeil (1972)
8. Palace of the Winds (1972–73)
9. Palace of the Winds (ceiling painting in the Teatro Museo Dalí; detail) (1972–73)
10. Polyhedron. Basketball Players Being Transformed into Angels (Assembling a Hologram – the Central Element) (1972), Pérez Simón collection, Mexico Gala-Salvador Dalí Foundation
11. Quantification of Leonardo de Vinci's "Last Supper" (1972)
12. Radiators, Radiator-Covers (1972)
13. Self-Portrait (Photomontage with the famous "Mao-Marilyn" that Philippe Halsman created at Dalí's wish) (1972)
14. Sfumato (1972)
15. The Sleeping Smoker (1972–73)
16. The Sleeping Smoker (1972–73)
17. Space Eve (1972)
18. Trajan on Horseback (1972)
19. Untitled (Stereoscopic Painting) (1972)

==== 1973 ====
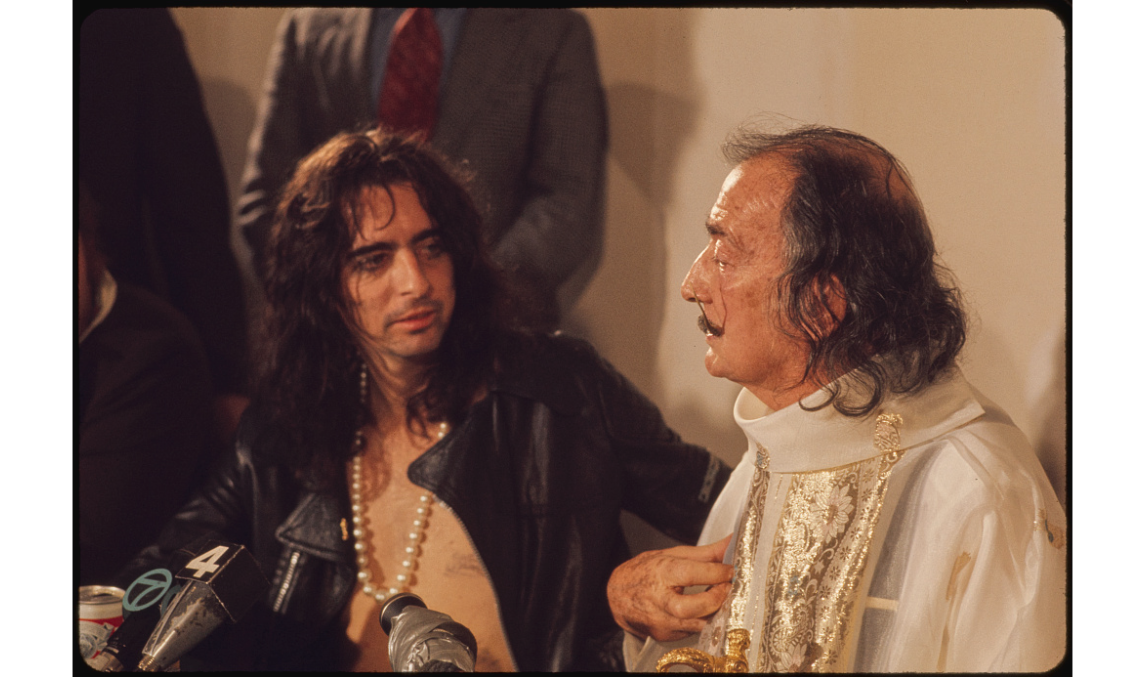
Alice Cooper (left) and Dali in 1973

1. Dalí Seen from the Back Painting Gala from the Back Eternalised by Six Virtual Corneas Provisionally Reflected by Six Real Mirrors (unfinished) (1972–73, 60.5 x 60.5 cm) (stereoscopic painted in duplicate but for a small variance)Dali Theatre and Museum, Figueres, Spain
2. Dalí Seen from the Back Painting Gala from the Back Eternalized by Six Virtual Corneas Provisionally Reflected by Six Real Mirrors (unfinished) (stereoscopic painted in duplicate but for a small variance) (1972–73)
3. Behind (1973)
4. Ceiling of the "Palace of the Wind" (1973)
5. Figurine-Nike sur un Socle (1973)
6. Gala's Castle at Pubol (1973)
7. Hercules and Gravida (1973)
8. Hitler Masturbating (1973)
9. Holos! Holos! Velazquez! Gabor! (1973)
10. Las Galas of Port Lligat (1973)
11. Pomona, Autumn (1973)
12. Monument to Picasso (1973)
13. Portrait of Dr. Brian Mercer (1973), Royal Society, London Gala-Salvador Dalí Foundation
14. The Reverie of the Prince (El ensueno del principe) (1973–79), Collection of King Juan Carlos Gala-Salvador Dalí Foundation
15. Study for the Commemoration of the First Cylindrical Hologram for Alice Cooper (1973)
16. Three Hyper-Realist Graces (Anti-Racism) (1973)

==== 1974 ====
1. The Angel of Alchemy (1974)
2. Armchair with Landscape Painted for Gala's Chateau at Pubol (1974)
3. Battle in the Clouds (1974)
4. The Black Mass (1974)
5. Bust of Velazquez Turning into Three Figures Conversing (1974)
6. Christ of St. John of the Cross (1974)
7. Cranach Metamorphosis (Woman in a Mirror) (1974)
8. Equestrian Portrait of Carmen Bordiu-Franco (1974)
9. Figure with Swan (1974)
10. Gala at the Window (1974)
11. Gala Contemplating the Mediterranean Sea Which at Twenty Meters Becomes the Portrait of Abraham Lincoln – Homage to Rothko (first version) (1974–75) Dalí Theatre and Museum, Figueres, Spain
12. Gala's Foot (1974)
13. Gala's Foot (left panel) (1974)
14. Gala's Foot (right panel) (1974)
15. Nieuw Amsterdam (1974) (object/sculpture)
16. Nude coming up a Stairway (1974)
17. The Palace of the Wind (1974)
18. The Palace of the Wind (1974)
19. Patio-Garden of the Dalí Museum-Theatre in Figueres (1974)
20. The Phoenix (1974)
21. Ruggiero Freeing Angelica (1974)
22. The Shoe (Surrealist Object Functioning Symbolically) (1974)
23. The Shoe (Surrealist Object Functioning Symbolically) (reconstruction) (1974)
24. Standing Female Nude (1974)
25. To Meli (1974)
26. Transformation of "Antiques" Magazine Cover into the Apparition of a Face (1974)
27. Wounded Soft Watch (1974)

==== 1975 ====
1. Castor and Pollux (1975)
2. The Chair (stereoscopic work, left component) (1975)
3. The Chair (stereoscopic work, right component) (1975)
4. Flamme-Figure (1975)
5. Gala Nude Looking at the Sea Which at 18 Metres Appears the President Lincoln (1975)
6. The Giraffe (The Giraffe of Avignon) (1975)
7. Imaginations and Objects of the Future portfolio (1975), University of Michigan Museum of Art
8. Lullus – Homage to Raimundus Lullus (design for a ceiling painting) (1975)
9. Nude in a Landscape (1975)
10. Study for "The Chair" (1975)
11. The Ten Commandments (Silver Medal sculptures) (1975)

==== 1976 ====
1. Architectural Design (Eye Catching Economy) (1976)
2. The Chair (stereoscopic work, left component) (1976)
3. The Chair (stereoscopic work, right component) (1976)
4. Christ Twisted (1976)
5. Christ Twisted (1976)
6. Gala Contemplating the Mediterranean Sea Which at Twenty Meters Becomes the Portrait of Abraham Lincoln – Homage to Rothko (second version) (1976) The Dali Museum, St Petersburg, Florida
7. Homage to Philosophy (1976)
8. Las Meninas (The Maids-in-Waiting) (stereoscopic work, left component) (1976–77) Museo Nacional Centro de Arte Reina Sofía, Madrid
9. Las Meninas (The Maids-in-Waiting) (stereoscopic work, right component) (1976–77) Museo Nacional Centro de Arte Reina Sofía, Madrid
10. Musical Harmony (1976)
11. Perseu (1976)
12. Portrait of Gala (1976–77)
13. Preparatory Drawing for "The Chair" (1976)
14. Soft Monster (Monstruo blando adormercido) (1976)
15. Study for "Las Meninas" (stereoscopic work, left component) (1976)
16. Study for "Las Meninas" (stereoscopic work, right component) (1976)
17. Trajano to Horse (1976)
18. The Unicorn (unfinished) (1976)
19. The Wash Basin (stereoscopic work, left component) (1976)
20. The Wash Basin (stereoscopic work, right component) (1976)

==== 1977 ====
1. Soft Monster in Angelic Landscape (1977), Vatican Museums Gala-Salvador Dalí Foundation
2. Aurora's Head, After Michelangelo (detail of a Figure on the Grave of Lorenzo Di Medici) (1977)
3. Dalí Lifting the Skin of the Mediterranean Sea to Show Gala the Birth of Venus (stereoscopic work, right component) (1977)
4. Dalí's Hand Drawing Back the Golden Fleece in the Form of a Cloud to Show Gala the Dawn, Completely Nude, Very, Very Far Away Behind the Sun (stereoscopic work, left component) (1977)
5. Dalí's Hand Drawing Back the Golden Fleece in the Form of a Cloud to Show Gala the Dawn, Completely Nude, Very, Very Far Away Behind the Sun (stereoscopic work, right component) (1977)
6. Daphne: the Tree Woman (1977)
7. Fertility (1977)
8. The Happy Unicorn (1977)
9. Head (stair-way in the museum) (1977)
10. Las Meninas (The Maids-in-Waiting) – first metaphysical hyper-realist painting (unfinished) (1977)
11. Lincoln in Dalivision (1977)
12. Mae West Room (1977)
13. Monument dedicated to Francesco Pujol (Catalan philosopher) (1977)
14. Nike, Victory Goddess of Samothrace, Appears in a Tree Bathed in Light (1977)
15. Patio of the Teatro-Museo Dalí (1977)
16. Portrait of Gala (1977)
17. Randomdot Correlogram – The Golden Fleece (stereoscopic work, left component; unfinished) (1977)
18. Randomdot Correlogram – The Golden Fleece (stereoscopic work, right component; unfinished) (1977)
19. Soft Skulls with Fried Egg Without the Plate, Angels and Soft Watch in an Angelic Landscape (1977)
20. Spanish Knight (1977)
21. Study for "Dalí Lifting the Skin of the Mediterranean Sea to Show Gala the Birth of Venus" (1977)
22. Surrealist Angel (1977)
23. Untitled (1977)
24. Virgin with Swallows (1977)

==== 1978 ====
1. Allegory of Spring (1978)
2. Ampurdanese Landscape (1978)
3. Cybernetic Odalisque (1978)
4. Lugubrious Planarian (unfinished) (1978)
5. The Eye of the Angelus (stereoscopic work, left component; unfinished) (1978)
6. The Eye of the Angelus (stereoscopic work, right component; unfinished) (1978)
7. Gala's Christ (stereoscopic work, left component) (1978), Pérez Simón collection, Mexico Gala-Salvador Dalí Foundation
8. Gala's Christ (stereoscopic work, right component) (1978), Pérez Simón collection, Mexico
9. The Harmony of the Spheres (1978)
10. Landscape Near Ampurdan (1978)
11. Pierrot Lunaire (stereoscopic work, unfinished) (1978)
12. A postage stamp designed by Dali for the French mail (1978)
13. Stereoscopic Composition, Based on Millet's "Angelus" (unfinished) (1978)
14. Stereoscopic Composition, Based on Millet's "Angelus" (unfinished) (1978)
15. Study for The Harmony of the Spheres (1978)
16. Woman with Egg and Arrows (1978)
17. Gala Gradiva (1978)

==== 1979 ====
1. Athens Is Burning! The School of Athens and the Fire in the Borgo (stereoscopic work, left component) (1979–80)
2. Athens Is Burning! The School of Athens and the Fire in the Borgo (stereoscopic work, right component) (1979–80)
3. Battle in the Clouds (stereoscopic work, left component) (1979)
4. Battle in the Clouds (stereoscopic work, right component) (1979)
5. Copy of a Rubens Copy of a Leonardo (1979)
6. Dawn, Noon, Sunset, and Twilight (1979) Dalí Theatre and Museum, Figueres, Spain
7. Gala Bouquet (1979)
8. Long Live the Station at Perpignan, Long Live Figueras (1979)
9. More Beautiful than Canova (1979)
10. Nude and Horse with Metamorphosis (unfinished) (1979)
11. Pentagonal Sardana (stereoscopic work, left component) (1979)
12. Pentagonal Sardana (stereoscopic work, right component) (1979)
13. Phosphene (1979) Museo Nacional Centro de Arte Reina Sofía, Madrid
14. Raphaelesque Hallucination (1979)
15. Searching for the Fourth Dimension (1979)
16. A Soft Watch Put in the Appropriate Place to Cause a Young Ephebe to Die and Be Resuscitated by Excess of Satisfaction (unfinished) (1979)
17. Study for "Compianto Diabele" by Canova (unfinished) (1979)
18. Three Graces of Canova (unfinished) (1979)
19. The Lost Wax (1979)

=== 1980–1985 ===
==== 1980 ====
1. "The Chemist (Les Mysteres de L′Alchimiste)" (1980)
2. Arabs (1980)
3. Arabs (1980)
4. The Cheerful Horse (1980) Dalí Theatre and Museum, Figueres, Spain
5. Group Surrounding a Reclining Nude – Velazquez (1980–81)
6. Sleeping Young Narcissus (1980)
7. Untitled (Bridge with Reflections; sketch for a dual image picture, unfinished) (1980)
8. Untitled (Landscape with Celestial Beings) (1980)
9. The Harmony of the Spheres (1980)

==== 1981 ====
1. Amphitrite (1981) Museo Nacional Centro de Arte Reina Sofía, Madrid
2. Apparition of the Visage of Aphrodite of Cnide in a Landscape (1981)
3. Argus (1981)
4. Classic Figure and Head (unfinished) (1981–82)
5. The Exterminating Angels (1981)
6. Figures (Scene after Goya) (1981)
7. Gala in a Patio Watching the Sky, Where the Equestrian Figure of Prince Baltasar Carlos and Several Constellations (All) Appear, after Velazquez (1981)
8. The Garden of Hours (1981)
9. The Gaseous Swan (1981)
10. Great Tapeworm Masturbator, Appears Behind Arcades (1981)
11. Hermes (1981) Museo Nacional Centro de Arte Reina Sofía, Madrid
12. Jason Carrying the Golden Fleece (unfinished) (1981)
13. Landscape (1981)
14. Landscape with Rock in the Shape of a Triumphal Arch (1981)
15. Medea or Jason Taking Possession of the Golden Fleece (1981)
16. Mercury and Argos (1981)
17. The Path of the Enigma (first version) (1981, 140 x 94 cm) The Dalí Theatre and Museum, Figueres, Spain
18. The Path of the Enigma (second version) (1981)
19. The Pearl (1981)
20. Reading. Family Scene by Lamplight (1981)
21. Ready-to-wear Fashion for Next Spring: "Garlands, Nests and Flowers" (1981)
22. Seated Figure Contemplating a "Great Tapeworm Masturbator" (1981)
23. Spanish Nobleman with a Cross of Brabant on His Jerkin (1981)
24. Three Female Figures in Festive Gowns (1981)
25. Tower (1981)
26. Tower (1981)
27. The Tower of Enigmas (1981)
28. The Towers (1981)
29. Untitled (Female Bust with Draped Cloth) (1981)
30. Untitled (Head of a Woman; unfinished) (1981)
31. Untitled (Imaginary Landscape at Pubol) (1981)
32. Untitled (Skin of a Beach) (1981)
33. Woman on a Ram (1981)

==== 1982 ====
1. After the Head of "Giuliano di Medici", Florence (1982)
2. After Michelangelo's "Moses", on the Tomb of Julius II in Rome (1982)
3. After Michelangelo's "Squatting Child" (1982)
4. Architectural Contortion of El Escorial (1982)
5. Atmospherocephalic Figures (1982)
6. Don Jose Nieto Velazquez from "Las Meninas" by Velazquez, Musec, Del Prado, Madrid (1982)
7. Double Victory of Gaudi (1982)
8. El Escorial and Catastrophe-Form Calligraphy (1982)
9. Enigma (unfinished version of "The Three Glorious Enigmas of Gala") (1982)
10. Exploded Head (1982)
11. Figure after Michelangelo's "Dawn" on the Tomb of Lorenzo di Medici (1982)
12. Figure in the Water – After a Drawing by Michelangelo for the "Resurrection of Christ" (1982)
13. Figure Inspired by the Adam of the Ceiling of the Sistine Chapel (1982)
14. Geological Echo. La Pietà (1982) The Dalí Theatre and Museum, Figueres, Spain
15. "Giuliano di Medici" by Michelangelo, Seen from Behind (1982)
16. Head, after Michelangelo's, "Giuliano di Medici" (1982)
17. Hysterical Venus de Milo (1982–83)
18. In the Courtyard of the Escorial, the Silhouette of Sebastian De Morra, in which the Face of Gala, Surrounded by Catastrophic Signs, Appears (stereoscopic work, unfinished) (1982)
19. The Infanta Margarita of Velazquez Appearing in the Silhouette of Horsemen in the Courtyard of the Escorial (1982)
20. Landscape with Hidden Image of Michelangelo's "David" (1982)
21. Martyr – Inspired by the Sufferings of Dalí in His Illness (1982)
22. Mirror Women – Mirror Heads (1982)
23. Ole (1982)
24. Othello Dreaming Venice (1982)
25. Pieta (1982)
26. Pieta (1982)
27. Rock Figure after the Head of Christ in the "Pieta" of Palestrina by Michelangelo (1982)
28. Saint Sebastian (1982)
29. Scene in the Courtyard of the Escorial with a Figure in the Foreground Inspired by Michelangelo's "Evening" on the Tomb of Lorenzo di Medici (1982)
30. Sebastian de Morra with Catastrophic Signs (stereoscopic work, unfinished) (1982)
31. Study for "Ole" (unfinished) (1982)
32. The Three Glorious Enigmas of Gala (1982)
33. The Three Glorious Enigmas of Gala (second version) (1982)
34. The Tomb of Francesco Pujols (1982)
35. Topological Study for "Exploded Head" (1982)
36. Untitled (After "The Day" by Michelangelo) (1982)
37. Untitled (After "The Night" by Michelangelo) (1982)
38. Untitled (Composition – Courtyard of the Escorial with Figure and Sebastian De Morra, Velazquez's Dwarf) (1982)
39. Untitled (first study for "The Three Glorious Enigmas of Gala") (1982)
40. Untitled – Equestrian Figure of Prince Baltasar Carlos, after Velazquez, with Figures in the Courtyard of the Escorial (1982)
41. Untitled – Nude Figures after Michelangelo (1982)
42. Velazquez and a Figure (1982)
43. Velazquez Dying Behind the Window on the Left Side Out of Which a Spoon Projects (1982)
44. Warrior (1982)

==== 1983 ====
1. Bed and Bedside Table Ferociously Attacking a Cello (1983)
2. Bed and Two Bedside Tables Ferociously Attacking a Cello (1983)
3. Bed and Two Bedside Tables Ferociously Attacking a Cello (1983)
4. Bed and Two Bedside Tables Ferociously Attacking a Cello (Final Stage) (1983)
5. Bed and Two Bedside Tables Ferociously Attacking a Cello (last state) (1983)
6. Bed, Chair and Bedside Table Ferociously Attacking a Cello (1983)
7. Car (1983)
8. Cutlet and Match – The Chinese Crab (1983)
9. Descent from the Cross of a Cello-Christ (1983)
10. Head Inspired by Michelangelo (1983)
11. Le Cheval de Triomphe – The Triumph Horse (1983)
12. Pieta (1983)
13. The Pieta of the Cello-Christ (1983)
14. St. George Overpowering a Cello (1983)
15. Study for Bed and Two Bedside Tables Ferociously Attacking a Cello (1983)
16. Study for Chair and Bedside Table Ferociously Attacking a Cello (1983)
17. The Swallow's Tail (1983)
18. Topological Abduction of Europe – Homage to Rene Thom (1983)
19. Topological Contortion of a Female Figure (1983)
20. Topological Contortion of a Female Figure Becoming a Violoncello (1983) Museo Nacional Centro de Arte Reina Sofía, Madrid
21. Torre Galatea (1983)
22. The Truck (We'll be arriving later, about five o'clock) (1983)
23. Untitled (Figures, Pieta, Catastrophic Signs) (1983)
24. Untitled – Head of a Spanish Nobleman, Fashioned by the Catastrophe Model from a Swallow's Tail and Two Halves of a Cello (1983)
25. Untitled – Series on Catastrophes (1983)
26. Warrior Mounted on an Elephant Overpowering a Cello (1983)

==== 1984 ====
1. Alice in Wonderland (1984)
2. Hommage a Terpsichord (La Danse) (1984)
3. Profile du Temps (1984)
4. The Profile of Time (1984)

==== 1985 ====
1. "Bracceli" the Warrior with a Corpse – Torero Series (1985)
2. Head of Europa – Torero Series (1985)
3. Interpretation of Goya's Los Caprichos (1985)
4. Six Designs of Playing Cards, The Joker (1985)
5. Two Phoenixes in Combat – Torero Series (1985)

1988

1. Fin de Parzival (1929-1988) [Realized together with Wolf Vostell] Museo Vostell Malpartida

== Literary works ==
=== Novels ===
Under the encouragement of the poet Federico García Lorca, Dalí attempted an approach to a literary career through the means of the "pure novel". In his only literary production, Hidden Faces (1944), Dalí describes, in vividly visual terms, the intrigues and love affairs of a group of dazzling, eccentric aristocrats who, with their luxurious and extravagant lifestyle, symbolize the decadence of the 1930s.

=== Books ===
- 1938: The Tragic Myth of the Angelus of Millet (Le Mythe tragique de l'Angélus de Millet)
- 1942: The Secret Life of Salvador Dalí
- 1946: Illustrations for Macbeth
- 1948: 50 Secrets of Magic Craftsmanship
- 1963: Diary of a Genius
- 1973: Les Diners De Gala, an illustrated cookbook
- 1976: The Unspeakable Confessions of Salvador Dalí
- 1978: Les Vins de Gala du Divin, follow-up cookbook about wines

=== Librettos ===
In 1939, Salvador Dalí designed the set and wrote the libretto for a ballet entitled Bacchanale, based on Wagner's Tannhäuser and the myth of Leda and the Swan.

Être Dieu: opéra-poème, audiovisuel et cathare en six parties, "opera-poem" based on a libretto by Manuel Vázquez Montalbán, music by Igor Wakhévitch; published in 1985.

== Performing arts ==
=== Screenplays ===
- L'Age d'Or
- Babaouo
- Giraffes on Horseback Salad

=== Films ===
- Un Chien Andalou
- L'Age d'Or
- Destino (animated)

=== Music videos ===
- "Es Mi Hombre" by Maruja Garrido ft. Salvador Dalí

=== Albums ===
- Je suis fou de Dalí!

== Other ==
=== Clothing ===
- 1937: Lobster dress (with Elsa Schiaparelli)
- 1937-38: Shoe hat (with Elsa Schiaparelli)
- 1938: Skeleton Dress (with Elsa Schiaparelli)

=== Adverts ===
- 1968: Je suis fou du chocolat Lanvin.
- 1953: Girl in Love for De Beers Consolidated Mines.

=== Architecture ===
- 1930s: Monkton House, West Dean
- 1958: Crisalida.

=== Logos ===
- Chupa Chups
