= Landscape Near Figueras =

1910 painting by Salvador Dalí

- Artist: Salvador Dalí
- Year: 1910
- Type: Oil on postcard
- Dimensions: 14 cm × 9 cm (5 1/2 in × 3 1/2 in)
- Location: Salvador Dalí Museum; St. Petersburg, Florida

Landscape Near Figueras (1910) is a painting by the Spanish artist Salvador Dalí. This is one of the earliest known works by Dalí, having been painted when he was about six years old.

== History and description ==
At the beginning of Dalí's career, his primary influence was from the Impressionist movement. This painting is one of the purest examples of Dalí's impressionist period. Over the next ten years he would use increasingly brilliant colors and lighting until the 1920s, when he began creating cubist and Surrealist compositions.

This work was done during Dalí's first, "Developmental Period" which roughly lasted until 1928–1929. This period predates Surrealism and during this time he emulated and mastered existing styles of art, most notably the Baroque, Classical, Impressionistic, Cubist forms. Accordingly, the work exemplifies Dalí's early interest in impressionism.

Landscape Near Figueras was painted in oil over a 14 x 9 cm postcard. The sky was painted thinly, allowing part of the design of the postcard to show through. It was part of the private collection of Mr. Albert Field in Astoria, Queens, New York but now is part of the permanent collection of the Salvador Dalí Museum in St. Petersburg, Florida.

== See also ==
- List of works by Salvador Dalí

== Sources ==
- dali-gallery.com
