= Shirley Temple, The Youngest, Most Sacred Monster of the Cinema in Her Time =

1939 painting by Salvador Dalí

- Artist: Salvador Dalí
- Year: 1939
- Type: Gouache, pastel and collage on cardboard
- Dimensions: 75 cm × 100 cm (30 in × 39 in)
- Location: Museum Boijmans Van Beuningen; Rotterdam

Shirley Temple, The Youngest, Most Sacred Monster of the Cinema in Her Time (or Shirley Temple, The Youngest, Most Sacred Monster of Contemporary Cinema), also known as the Barcelona Sphinx, is an artwork in gouache, pastel and collage on cardboard, by surrealist painter Salvador Dalí, from 1939. It measures 75 cm × 100 cm (29 1/2 in × 39 1/2 in). It is housed at Museum Boijmans Van Beuningen, in Rotterdam.

The painting depicts the child star Shirley Temple as a sphinx. Shirley Temple's head, taken from a newspaper photograph, is superimposed on the body of a red lioness with breasts and white claws. On top of the head is a vampire bat. Surrounding the sphinx are a human skull and other bones, suggesting her latest kill. At the bottom of the painting is a trompe-l'œil label that reads: "Shirley!. at last in Technicolor." The painting has been described as a satire on the sexualization of child stars by Hollywood.

The painting was first shown at an exhibition held at the Julien Levy Gallery, New York, from March 21 to April 18, 1939. Although the exhibition catalogue does not mention the painting, an article in The New York Times mentions its presence. It has also been exhibited in 1983 at the Palau Reial de Pedralbes in Barcelona, in 1985 at the Palais des Beaux Arts in Charleroi, and again in Barcelona in 2004, at the CaixaForum gallery. From June 1 to September 9, 2007, it was one of around 100 Dalí works on display at the Tate Modern in London as part of the "Dalí and Film" exhibition.

== See also ==
- List of works by Salvador Dalí
