= The Face of War =

1940 painting by Salvador Dalí

The Face of War (aka The Visage of War)
- Artist: Salvador Dalí
- Year: 1940
- Medium: oil on canvas
- Dimensions: 64 cm × 79 cm (25.2 in × 31.1 in)
- Location: Museum Boijmans Van Beuningen; Rotterdam

The Face of War (The Visage of War; in Spanish La Cara de la Guerra) is an oil painting by the Spanish surrealist Salvador Dalí, from 1940. It was painted during a brief period when the artist lived in California. The painting is owned by the Museum Boijmans Van Beuningen, in Rotterdam

== History and description ==
The trauma and the view of war had often served as inspiration for Dalí's work. He sometimes believed his artistic vision to be premonitions of war. This work was painted between the end of the Spanish Civil War [1936] and the beginning of the Second World War (1939).

The painting depicts a withered, disembodied head hovering against a barren desert landscape. The face is withered like that of a corpse and wears an expression of fear and misery. In its mouth and eye sockets, there are identical faces. In their mouths and eyes, there are more identical faces in a process implied to be infinite. Swarming around the large face are biting serpents. In the lower right corner is a handprint that Dalí insisted was left by his own hand.

== See also ==
- List of works by Salvador Dalí

== Sources ==
- dali-gallery.com
