= The Accommodations of Desire =

1929 painting by Salvador Dalí

- Artist: Salvador Dalí
- Year: 1929
- Medium: Collage
- Dimensions: 22.2 cm (8.7 in) × 34.9 cm (13.7 in)
- Location: Metropolitan Museum of Art
- Accession no.: 1999.363.16
- Identifiers: The Met object ID: 490036

The Accommodations of Desire is a 1929 surrealist oil painting and mixed media collage on board by Spanish artist Salvador Dalí. It is now in the Metropolitan Museum of Art in New York City.

== History ==
Dalí was inspired to create the piece after a walk with his future wife Gala Dalí, who was at the time married to fellow surrealist Paul Éluard, with whom Dalí was having an affair. The painting purportedly represents Dalí's anxiety over the situation, and what the future would hold for him. The painting also mythologizes Dalí's relationship with his father.

The painted work consists primarily of seven large pebbles, each with a different symbol that Dalí believed would come to pass as a result of the affair.

The piece uses pasted-on cutouts from a children's book, whose visual style bears a striking resemblance to the aesthetic of the painting itself.

== See also ==
- List of works by Salvador Dalí
