= A Chemist Lifting with Extreme Precaution the Cuticle of a Grand Piano =

1936 painting by Salvador Dalí

- Artist: Salvador Dalí
- Year: 1936
- Medium: Oil on canvas
- Movement: Surrealism
- Dimensions: 48.3 cm × 64.1 cm (19.02 in × 25.25 in)
- Location: Art Institute of Chicago, Chicago
- Owner: Art Institute of Chicago

A Chemist Lifting with Extreme Precaution the Cuticle of a Grand Piano (Catalan: Un farmacèutic aixecant amb extrema precaució la cutícula d'un piano de cua) (Spanish: Farmacéutico levantando con suma precaución la cutícula de un piano de cola) is a 1936 oil painting by artist Salvador Dalí. The painting is an example of Dalí's distinctive, avant-garde brand of surrealism as well as a curious example of Dalí's mysterious relationship with Judaism.

== Description ==
The painting is set on a barren, mute landscape with a mostly monochromatic color scheme. To the left, the painting's titular character, the Chemist, has one leg on a rock and is lifting the edge of a grand piano which blends into the landscape. The instrument appears to have the consistency of a piece of cloth as if it has melted into the ground, no longer a solid object; this a quintessentially surrealist technique which appears prominently in many of Dalí's works, including The Persistence of Memory.

The painting was originally titled, Instantaneous presence of Louis II of Bavaria, Salvador Dalí, Lenin, and Wagner on the beach at Rosas, which sheds light on the identities of the characters present in the painting; the original titular figures were described by Dalí as "all the real and fantastic personages of the modern tragedy" – although many of them are admittedly difficult to distinguish with certainty in the painting's current form.

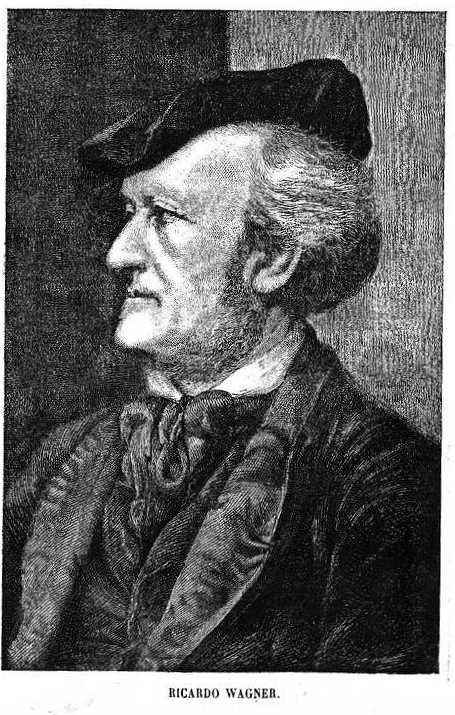
The old man depicted in Dalí's painting is German composer Richard Wagner

In the center of the painting sits German composer Richard Wagner in his distinctive beret-and-robe regalia. The ashen-faced man in the forefront depicted laying down and reading a newspaper bears a resemblance to Vladimir Lenin, a possible nod to surrealism's Communist underpinnings, and the Chemist is Friedrich Nietzsche, another intellectual Dalí admired.

Just beside Wagner stands a small boy carrying a hoop and stick, accoutrements used in a children's game known as hoop rolling, who is looking across the landscape at a woman garbed in a white dress out in the distance. And in the far right of the painting stands an African woman with pink, flowery hair wearing an orange dress staring in the direction of the Chemist.

The largely monotone color scheme juxtaposes the vibrant, almost holy, bright aura of yellow light surrounding Wagner, as well as a bright blue patch of sky in the upper right-hand corner visible through the clouds.

== Provenance ==
The painting was first sold by Julien Levy at an exhibition of Salvador Dalí's work in 1936. The Julien Levy Gallery was a prominent venue for Surrealists and avant-garde artists in the 1930s and 1940s. Levy sold the painting to Mr. Thomas Hart Fisher and Mrs. Ruth Page Fisher, who owned the painting until at least 1969. By 1985, the painting was in the possession of Mr. and Mrs. Joseph R. Shapiro. Mr. Shapiro was the founding president of the Museum of Contemporary Art in Chicago and an active trustee at the Art Institute of Chicago. The Art Institute of Chicago acquired the painting as a gift from Shapiro in 1996.

== Dalí, Wagner, and Judaism ==
=== Dalí's admiration for Wagner ===
Wagner was Dalí's favorite composer, and the painters connection to Wagner was personal and deeply rooted. As a child, Dalí would listen as his father sat by the family phonograph listening to Lohengrin – while Dalí's uncle, Anselm Domènech, was active in the Barcelona Wagner Association. In adulthood the infatuation continued, and even today a dozen or so recordings of Wagner's operas can be seen at the Dalí Castle in Púbol, as well as an eight-track tape of Wagner's Greatest Hits; moreover, the castle garden sports an ornate fountain inlayed with dozens of small busts of the composer he so admired. One of Dalí's especially beloved tracks, an old scratched record of Tristan und Isolde, played constantly, and was playing on the day Dalí died in 1989.

=== Wagner's antisemitism and Dalí's complicated relationship with Judaism ===
Even prior to Hitler's rise to power, Wagner was a well-known antisemite. As German author Jens Malte Fischer once quipped, "If you didn't know in the 1870s and 1880s that Wagner was a staunch anti-Semite, then you must have been pretty much deaf and blind."

Dalí's perennial obsession with Wagner – in addition to explicit Hitlerian iconography in some of his later works, such as in The Enigma of Hitler – led many to believe that Dalí himself harbored antisemitic views or had fascist sympathies. In addition to his love of Wagner and several fascist allusions in his paintings, Dalí publicly revealed several of his mystical, homoerotic fever dreams about Hitler: just before World War II, Dalí mused that “I often dreamed of Hitler as a woman” and later in his autobiography confessed that "Hitler turned me on in the highest." Dalí's fellow Surrealists, a group composed almost entirely of politically active Communists and anti-fascists, were not amused with these antics. Finally, one of their prominent members, Andre Breton, accused Dalí of glorifying Hitler, and promptly expelled him from the group.

This explicit fascist iconography and bizarre dalliance with Hitler, however, seemingly juxtaposes Dalí's relationship with Judaism in his later years. Dalí produced a surprising, yet remarkable corpus of Jewish works that differs widely from his other work. In 1968, Dalí produced a series of 25 lithographs entitled Aliyah, the Rebirth of Israel to celebrate the 20th anniversary of Israel's independence – Aliyah is a Hebrew word that literally means "migration to the land of Israel."

David R. Blumenthal, Professor of Judaic Studies at Emory University, described the paintings in the following way:

In spite of his having no inner connection with Zionism, Israel, and Judaism, Dali captured the spirit of the rebirth of the Jewish people in its homeland with remarkable focus (and, of course, remarkable skill). Thus, he captures the dryness of the land before the creation of the National Water Carrier and the richness of the land after its inauguration. Thus, too, he captures the victory and also the heavy price that was paid to give re-birth to the Jewish people in its homeland. He also has strong echoes of the Holocaust and Jewish religious symbols in this set of paintings and lithographs.

— David R. Blumenthal

It is widely circulated that Dalí's mother's family, the Domènech of Barcelona, had Jewish roots, but scholars agree this is not true. However, despite Dalí's lack of a personal connection to Judaism, it is clear that his work succeeded in capturing a 'Jewish essence' that resonated strongly with his new audience.

Dalí would go on to produce many more Jewish works. In 1971, Dalí created Song of Songs of Solomon, a portfolio of 12 drypoint etchings plus color and gold dust. That same year, Dalí produced another series of 13 vibrant etchings with color stencil in his work The Twelve Tribes of Israel – then again in 1975 with Moses and Monotheism.

Dalí's true views regarding Judaism and antisemitism remain the subject of the debate. Some believe that Dalí's later work represents a transformative supernova in his relationship with "the Jew" and Judaism, revealing, in a way, a spiritual connection or at the very least a profound empathy for the Jewish people. Conversely, some maintain his Jewish paintings represent a deceitful attempt to tap into a new, wealthy market for his artwork – constituting an elaborate ploy to exploit the Jews for commercial benefit.

Nonetheless, these artworks, and particularly A Chemist Lifting with Extreme Precaution the Cuticle of a Grand Piano, represent, perhaps, that early conflict between Dalí's unconscious fascist sympathies, manifested in his deification of Wagner, and his profound Jewish empathy, exemplified by his later work and the abiding pluralism of the eccentric and bizarre surrealist.

== See also ==
- List of works by Salvador Dalí
