= Couple with Their Heads Full of Clouds =

1936 painting by Salvador Dalí

Couple with Their Heads Full of Clouds (French: Couple aux Têtes Pleines de Nuages) is a 1936 diptych painting by Salvador Dalí. The oil on plywood work represent tables in a desert landscape and are cut out like the silhouettes of the characters in Jean-François Millet's painting The Angelus (L'Angélus). The works are both double portraits of Salvador and Gala Dalí.

== 1936 version ==
This work is part of the permanent collection of the Boijmans Van Beuningen Museum in Rotterdam.

== 1937 version ==
This work was sold for £8.31 million at auction at Bonham's in London in October 2020, the first time the work had ever come under the gavel.

The work was put up for sale by the Fondazione Isabella Scelsi, the foundation of the descendants of Giacinto Scelsi, the Italian Modernist composer and aristocrat. Previously the work was on loan to and displayed at the Museum of Modern and Contemporary Art of Trento and Rovereto. The work was displayed in 2018 at the Royal Academy of Art in London as part of the exhibition Dalí/Duchamp.

== See also ==
- List of works by Salvador Dalí
