= The Seven Lively Arts (Dalí) =

Series of seven paintings by Salvador Dalí

- Artist: Salvador Dalí
- Year: 1944 and 1957

The Seven Lively Arts was a series of seven paintings created by the Spanish surrealist painter Salvador Dalí in 1944 and, after they were lost in a fire in 1956, recreated in an updated form by Dalí in 1957. The paintings depicted the seven arts of dancing, opera, ballet, music, cinema, radio/television and theatre.

== Background ==
In 1944, as the Second World War was drawing to a conclusion, the impresario Billy Rose, who had bought the Ziegfeld Theatre and converted it back from a cinema to a theater, decided to put on a musical revue, with music by Cole Porter and Igor Stravinski, entitled the Seven Lively Arts. As an additional attraction he commissioned Salvador Dalí to create the original series of seven artworks for display in the theatre lobby. They were painted on site by Dalí in a second floor room. The show ran for 183 performances after which the paintings remained on display for a further ten years, where they were photographed by Life magazine, albeit in black and white. They were then removed to hang in Rose's mansion, Mount Kisco, in New York State. Two years later they were all destroyed in a fire, along with other works of art.

In 1957 Dalí, as an act of gratitude and friendship, offered to recreate the paintings, in an updated form, for the same price as the originals. They were initially hung in Rose's Manhattan apartment, but later dispersed to a number of private collections.

== Works ==
Dance

- Original: The Art of Boogie-Woogie Gala-Salvador Dalí Foundation
- Recreation: Rock 'n Roll, Morohashi Museum of Modern Art, Fukushima, Japan Gala-Salvador Dalí Foundation (once owned by the Escobar family in Colombia)

Opera

- Original: The Art of Opera Gala-Salvador Dalí Foundation
- Recreation: The Grand Opera Gala-Salvador Dalí Foundation

Ballet

- Original: The Art of Ballet Gala-Salvador Dalí Foundation
- Recreation: Metamorphosed Women Gala-Salvador Dalí Foundation

Music

- Original: The Art of Concert Gala-Salvador Dalí Foundation
- Recreation: Red Orchestra, Nahmad collection Gala-Salvador Dalí Foundation

Cinema

- Original: The Art of Cinema Gala-Salvador Dalí Foundation
- Recreation: Celestial Ride Gala-Salvador Dalí Foundation

Radio/Television

- Original: The Art of Radio Gala-Salvador Dalí Foundation
- Recreation: Modern Rhapsody Gala-Salvador Dalí Foundation

Theater

- Original: The Art of Theater Gala-Salvador Dalí Foundation
- Recreation: Bewitchment or Sorcery Gala-Salvador Dalí Foundation

== See also ==
- List of works by Salvador Dalí
