= A Logician Devil =

1951 print by Salvador Dalí

A Logician Devil or The Logician Devil is an illustration of Lucifer created by Salvador Dalí referencing Dante Alighieri's Divine Comedy. The image is one of 100 illustrations made by Dalí between 1950 and 1960 inspired by the Divine Comedy.

== See also ==
- List of works by Salvador Dalí
