= Vilabertran (Dalí) =

1913 painting by Salvador Dalí

- Artist: Salvador Dalí
- Year: 1913
- Type: Oil on cardboard
- Dimensions: 20 cm × 15 cm (7.87 in × 5.90 in)
- Location: Private collection; Astoria, Queens

Vilabertran (1913) is a painting by the Spanish surrealist artist Salvador Dalí. This is among Dalí's earliest works, having been painted when he was about nine years old. It is an oil painting on cardboard of a landscape from Vilabertran, where Dalí often worked and which he often drew in his early period.

== See also ==
- List of works by Salvador Dalí
