= Apparition of Face and Fruit Dish on a Beach =

Painting by Salvador Dalí

Apparition of a Face and Fruit Dish on a Beach
- Artist: Salvador Dalí
- Year: 1938
- Medium: Oil on canvas
- Dimensions: 114.8 cm × 143.8 cm (45.2 in × 56.6 in)
- Location: Wadsworth Atheneum; Hartford

Apparition of Face and Fruit Dish on a Beach is an oil painting by the Spanish surrealist artist Salvador Dalí, from 1938. It is part of the Ella Gallup Sumner and Mary Catlin Sumner Collection of the Wadsworth Atheneum Museum of Art, in Hartford, Connecticut.

== Description ==
This work belongs to a group of paintings by Dalí that instantiate an optical illusion called the double, multiple, or ambiguous image.

The painting is dominated by a depiction of a stemmed silver fruit bowl containing pears. A deliberately created optical illusion of the human face occupies the same space as the dish; the fruits suggest wavy hair, the dish's bowl becomes the forehead, the stem of the dish serves as the bridge of the nose, and the dish's foot doubles as the chin. The eyes of the large face, however, are formed by background objects lying on the sand at the edge of the strand — deeper in the image — rather than sharing form with the fruit dish. The face's right eye is what appears to be a clay vase lying on its side, and the face's left eye a sprawling child. A similar face reappears other paintings by Dalí, including The Endless Enigma.

In the middle ground of the scene, where the sand of the beach appears to end, a small version of the fruit dish/face can be seen on the ground with a few pears scattered near it. Another face appears further back, just to the right of the elbow of the nude male figure. In the same area of the painting, two dogs are playing along a path in the distance. One of those dogs is itself an echo of the immense, illusionary figure of a dog which stretches from the left to the right margin of the painting, with the dog's collar formed by a multi-arched bridge or aqueduct in the landscape beyond. This repetition of shapes is a frequent motif in Dalí's surrealist works.

== See also ==
- List of works by Salvador Dalí
