= The Lost Wax =

1979 sculpture by Salvador Dalí

Christ of St. John of the Cross (also known as The Lost Wax) is a sculpture by Salvador Dalí created in 1979 as the model for a series of platinum, gold, silver, and bronze reliefs. The original wax sculpture and the reliefs created from it are three-dimensional iterations of Dalí's 1951 painting, Christ of Saint John of the Cross. An estimated 900 reliefs were created from the wax model.

== Background and composition ==
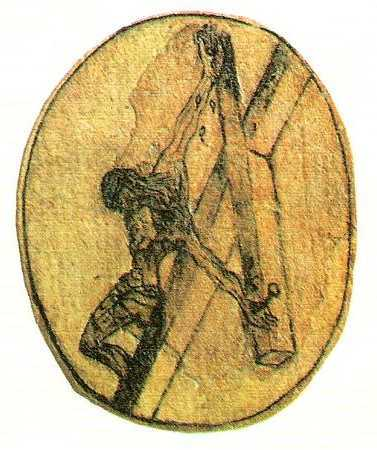
Sketch by John of the Cross, c. 1550, which inspired Salvador Dalí

In his mid-life, Salvador Dalí (1904–1989) began to explore his Catholic faith in his artwork. One of his most important religious works, the painting Christ of Saint John of the Cross, was completed in 1951. It was inspired by a sketch by a 16th-century Spanish Catholic priest, John of the Cross, who depicted the crucifixion of Jesus as he professed to have seen it in a religious vision. Like John of the Cross's sketch, Dalí's painting depicts the crucifixion from “either God's point of view, or maybe even from Christ's own point of view as his spirit rose out of his body", a composition not typically used to represent the scene.

Dali later sculpted by hand as a three-dimensional iteration of his 1951 painting. Reliefs in platinum, gold, silver, and bronze were then created from this wax sculpture. The sculpture, also named Christ of St. John of the Cross, was completed in 1979 and an estimated 900 reliefs were created from it.

The sculpture also includes a small sailboat and the letters INRI above the halo over Jesus's head. The piece remains in the plexiglass casing created by the artist for the work.

== Provenance ==
For four decades, the wax sculpture was believed to have been lost, but was in the private vault of a collector closely associated with Dalí. The private collector had acquired The Lost Wax from Dalí at a meeting in Paris. The wax sculpture was long believed to have been lost because preserving the original wax models used to create reliefs is very difficult.

The work was rediscovered and exhibited to the public on May 11, 2022, on the 118th anniversary of Dalí's birth. The wax sculpture was acquired from a private collector by Harte International Galleries in Maui, Hawaii.

== See also ==
- List of works by Salvador Dalí
