= The Apotheosis of Homer (Dalí) =

Painting by Salvador Dalí

- Artist: Salvador Dalí
- Year: c. 1945
- Medium: oil on canvas
- Dimensions: 63.7 cm × 116.7 cm (25.1 in × 45.9 in)
- Location: Bayerische Staatsgemäldesammlungen, Pinakothek der Moderne, Munich

The Apotheosis of Homer is an oil on canvas painting by Salvador Dalí, created c. 1945. It is at the Bayerische Staatsgemäldesammlungen, Pinakothek der Moderne, in Munich.

== Description ==
The canvas reflects the painter's fascination with Greek and Roman history and mythology. Gloria Platzner speculates that Dalí "reduces Homer to a piece of broken statuary, a relic, while the solid temple of the muse itself melts"... The "ethereal horse" in the painting, which may be Pegasus, rejecting the riders who attempt to reach the stars, again signals the cessation of the myth. On the right, Gala, his wife, is depicted as a sleeping nude woman.

== See also ==
- List of works by Salvador Dalí
