= Bacchanale =

Orgiastic musical composition

A bacchanale is an orgiastic musical composition, often depicting a drunken revel or bacchanal.

Examples include the bacchanales in Camille Saint-Saëns's Samson and Delilah, the Venusberg scene in Richard Wagner's Tannhäuser, Danse générale (Bacchanale) from Maurice Ravel's Daphnis et Chloé, and Grande bacchanale des saisons in Alexander Glazunov's The Seasons. John Cage wrote a Bacchanale in 1940, his first work for prepared piano. The French composer Jacques Ibert was commissioned by the BBC for the tenth anniversary of the Third Programme in 1956, for which he wrote a bacchanale.

In 1939, Salvador Dalí designed the set and wrote the libretto for a ballet entitled Bacchanale, based on Wagner's Tannhäuser and the myth of Leda and the Swan.

Bacchanale (1954) was written by composer Toshiro Mayuzumi for 5 saxophones (soprano, 2 alto, tenor, baritone), timpani, percussion (4), piano, celesta, harp, and strings. The previous year, he had written a Bacchanale for orchestra.

"Bacchanale" is also a track composed by Greek musician Vangelis on his album Heaven and Hell.

Florent Schmitt's Dionysiaques for Band, Op. 62, No. 1 (1913) is a masterpiece of instrumental drunkenness.
