= Swans Reflecting Elephants =

1937 painting by Salvador Dalí

- Artist: Salvador Dalí
- Year: 1937
- Medium: Oil on canvas
- Movement: Surrealism
- Dimensions: 51 cm × 77 cm (20.08 in × 30.31 in)
- Location: private collection

Swans Reflecting Elephants is an oil on canvas painting by the Spanish surrealist Salvador Dalí, from 1937. It is held in a private collection.

== History and description ==
This painting is from Dalí's Paranoiac-critical period. It contains one of Dalí's famous double images. The double images were a major part of Dalí's "paranoia-critical method", which he put forward in his 1935 essay "The Conquest of the Irrational". He explained his process as a "spontaneous method of irrational understanding based upon the interpretative critical association of delirious phenomena." Dalí used this method to bring forth the hallucinatory forms, double images and visual illusions that filled his paintings during the 1930s, most likely his most creative decade.

Swans Reflecting Elephants is created during the Surrealist movement. Dalí's interest in Sigmund Freud’s psychoanalytic theories is reflected in the work, which uses double images to illustrate themes related to the unconscious mind and the interplay between reality and illusion.

As with the earlier Metamorphosis of Narcissus, Swans Reflecting Elephants uses the reflection in a lake to create the double image seen in the painting. In Metamorphosis, the reflection of Narcissus is used to mirror the shape of the hand on the right of the picture. Here, the three swans in front of bleak, leafless trees are reflected in the lake so that the swans' necks become the elephants' trunks, the swans' bodies become the elephants' ears, and the trees become the legs of the elephants. In the background of the painting is a Catalan landscape depicted in fiery fall colors, the brushwork creating swirls in the cliffs that surround the lake, to contrast with the stillness of the water.

== See also ==
- List of works by Salvador Dalí
