= Villa Salesse =

Coordinates: 44.663°N 1.159°W

General information
- Architectural style: Colonial
- Location: 131 Boulevard de la Plage, Arcachon, France
- Completed: 1854
- Demolished: 2025

Villa Salesse was a French historic 1854 colonial-style residence and wartime refuge of Salvador Dalí, demolished in 2025 following its sale to the Mayor of Arcachon.

== History ==
=== 19th-century origins ===
The villa was commissioned in 1854 by Jean-Eugène Salesse during the formative years of Arcachon. The property remained in the continuous ownership of the Salesse family for over 160 years, allowing the building to remain in its near-original state until the early 21st century. This made it a unique vestige of the pre-Pereire era of urban development.

=== The Dalí period (1939–1940) ===
Following the outbreak of World War II, Salvador Dalí and Gala sought refuge in Arcachon, renting Villa Salesse from Henry Calvé in late 1939. During this stay, Dalí utilized his "double-image" technique to paint Slave Market with the Disappearing Bust of Voltaire. The villa also served as an intellectual hub for the Surrealist movement, hosting figures such as Leonor Fini and Marcel Duchamp. On 20 June 1940, the Dalís obtained emergency visas from Aristides de Sousa Mendes and fled to the United States.

== Architecture ==
Villa Salesse was a primary example of the colonial style inspired by designs found in the East Indies. The defining feature was the varangue, a deep, shaded wooden veranda encircling the main structure supported by a péristyle of slender cast-iron columns. The eaves were adorned with ornate decorative lambrequins.

== Demolition ==
Sold to the Mayor of Arcachon in 2021, the historic 1854 Villa Salesse underwent extensive demolition by September 2025.

== See also ==
- Arcachon
- Arcachon villa
- Surrealism
- Aristides de Sousa Mendes
