= Bulletism =

Bulletism is a Surrealist art technique that involves shooting ink at a blank piece of paper. The resulting pattern is similar to a blot, which the artist can then interpret and develop into images.

The technique was named by Salvador Dalí.

== History ==
The idea of interpreting random forms has precedents in earlier artistic practices. Leonardo da Vinci suggested that "just as one can hear any desired syllable in the sound of a bell, so one can see any desired figure in the shape formed by throwing a sponge with ink against the wall."

== See also ==
- Surrealist techniques
- Automatic drawing
- Exquisite corpse
