= Metamorphosis of Narcissus =

1937 painting by Salvador Dalí

- Artist: Salvador Dalí
- Year: 1937
- Medium: Oil on canvas
- Dimensions: 51.2 cm × 78.1 cm (20.12 in × 30 3/4 in)
- Location: Tate Modern, London

External videos
- Dali's Metamorphosis of Narcissus, Smarthistory

Metamorphosis of Narcissus is an oil-on-canvas painting by the Spanish surrealist Salvador Dalí, from 1937. Originally titled Métamorphose de Narcisse, This painting is from Dalí's paranoiac-critical period and depicts his interpretation of the Greek myth of Narcissus. Dalí began his painting in the spring of 1937 while in Zürs, in the Austrian Alps.

== Myth of Narcissus ==
According to Greek mythology, Narcissus's beauty made him attractive to nearly everyone who saw him and both men and women pursued him, but he rejected all advances. One of his admirers, a nymph named Echo, fell so madly in love with him that, after he rejected her, she wasted away until only her voice remained. The goddess Nemesis, taking pity on Echo, convinced Narcissus to gaze into a pool. Upon seeing his face reflected in the water, Narcissus fell in love with his reflection. Because he was unable to embrace his reflection, Narcissus too wasted away and in his place grew the flower that bears his name, the narcissus.

== Dalí's interpretation ==
In Dalí's painting, he depicts the figure of Narcissus on the left side of the canvas crouched by a lake, with his head resting on his knee, and a stone hand clutching an egg mirroring the shape of his body on the right. From out of the cracked egg, a narcissus flower sprouts. In the mid-ground of the painting stands a group of Narcissus's rejected suitors. Before the mountains there is a third depiction of Narcissus in the form of a statue in the middle of a small chess board.

Metamorphosis of Narcissus differs from Dalí's other double-image paintings, in which there are multiple images hidden in one because Narcissus's figure is doubled in the stone hand.

Dalí composed a poem that he exhibited alongside his painting in 1937. The poem ends:

Now the great mystery draws near,
the great metamorphosis is about to occur.

Narcissus in his immobility, absorbed by his reflection with
the digestive slowness of carnivorous plants, becomes invisible.

There remains of him only
the hallucinatingly white oval of his head,
his head again more tender,
his head, chrysalis of hidden biological designs,
his head held up by the tips of the water’s fingers,
at the tips of the fingers
of the insensate hand,

of the terrible hand,
of the excrement-eating hand,
of the mortal hand
of his own reflection.

When that head slits
when that head splits
when that head bursts,
it will be the flower,
the new Narcissus,
Gala –
my narcissus

Metamorphosis of Narcissus and the poem, which was published by Éditions surréalistes, that accompanied it were the first works of Dalí's to be completed by utilizing his paranoiac-critical method. In a book that Dalí published in 1937, also titled Metamorphosis of Narcissus, the painter instructs viewers of his painting to observe it in a state of "distracted fixation". He writes:

"If one looks for some time, from a slight distance and with a certain 'distant fixedness', at the hypnotically immobile figure of Narcissus, it gradually disappears until at last it is completely invisible,"

implying that Narcissus will fade into the stone hand until he completely disappears.

== Dalí and Sigmund Freud ==
On July 19, 1938 in London, Dalí met Sigmund Freud, whom the painter had admired since the 1920s after reading Freud's book The Interpretation of Dreams. During their meeting, Dalí brought his painting Metamorphosis of Narcissus in hopes of using it to discuss the psychoanalytic theory of Narcissism and his concept of critical paranoia, which he developed based on Freud's concept of paranoia. He also was permitted to sketch Freud. The meeting was arranged by writer Stefan Zweig and Dalí's benefactor, Edward James, who was also in attendance and ultimately gained ownership of Metamorphosis of Narcissus.

== See also ==
- List of works by Salvador Dalí
