= Salvador Dalí and dance =

Salvador Dalí relation to dance

The Spanish artist Salvador Dalí (1904–1989) is known as a surrealist painter: however, he also created or contributed the script, costumes and set designs to a number of ballets, and dance is a motif often found in his painting.

== Ballet ==
Dalí as an artist was inspired by different people and aspects of his life; dance specifically was of great significance in his work and life. His involvement with ballet was at its greatest in the period 1938–1944, between the Spanish Civil War and the Second World War. Dalí claimed in 1974, that he had created 28 ballets, and according to Fleur Cowles, he contributed to more than 20 ballets, although most had little success and resulted in financial loss. Some of the ballets include Tristán Loco (with two versions, one in 1938 and the other in 1944) and the trilogy Bacanal-Laberinto-Sacrificio (1939–1941), on which he collaborated with Léonide Massine (a principal dancer and choreographer in the Ballets Russes).

Bacanal was considered scandalous after its debut in New York in 1939. The script, costumes and set design were all by Dalí. The theme of this ballet centered on King Ludwig II of Bavaria and his visions as he was losing his mind. Dalí placed a huge swan center stage from which the dancers entered the scene.

The second ballet, Laberinto, debuted in New York's Metropolitan Opera House on October 8, 1941. The script, scenery and wardrobe were all designed by Dalí. This ballet was about the legend of Theseus and the Minotaur, which Dalí intended to be an allegory of modern life. The dancers were dressed as roosters who reproduced an authentic cock fight. However, two of Dalí's original ideas for this ballet were not showcased: one of them was to destroy a grand piano and place the debris on the stage, the other was to symbolize the death of the Minotaur with a cooked calf head that the dancers would eat on stage.

According to Cowles, it is quite difficult to determine the degree to which Dalí contributed to the theater of his time, but an extensive technical understanding and courage is required in order to interpret Dalí's ideas.

== The dancer in Dalí ==
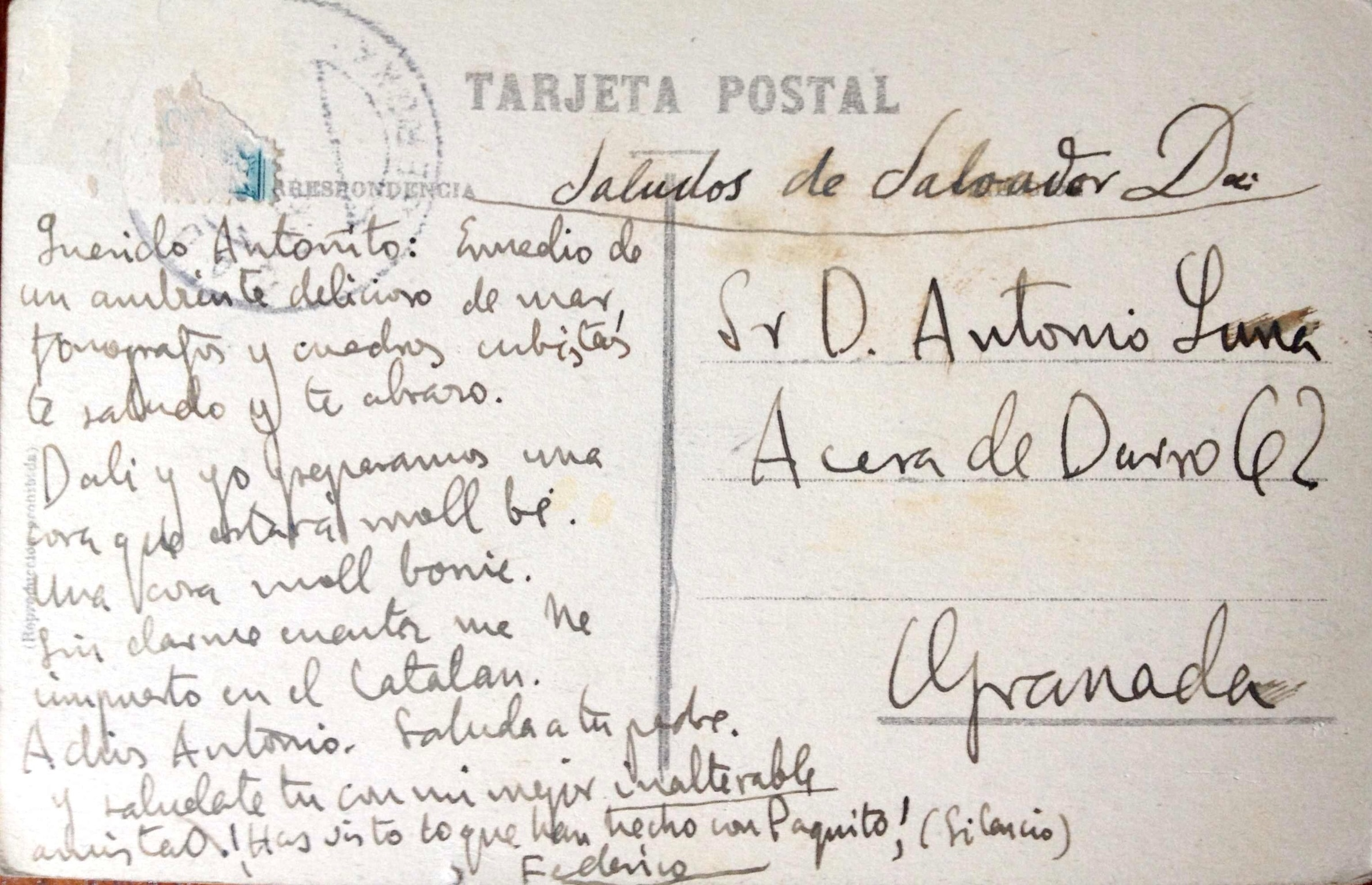
Postcard from Lorca and Dalí to Antonio de Luna

In his youth Dalí found great inspiration in classical music concerts, theater, and ballet. In his diary he confesses his admiration for The Dove, one of Isadora Duncan’s disciples. In 1926, one of Dali's letters to Federico Garcia Lorca, one of his best friends, he admits that after a long day of painting he would go to dance the Charleston in the evening. In a later letter, Dalí sent Lorca a photograph of himself where he is believed to be dancing the Charleston very happily.

Later in his life, references to dance are often found in his writing. Dalí describes Garcia Lorca's funeral as a spectacle in which his friend was dancing a horizontal ballet as they walked his casket down the streets.

Dalí maintained a lengthy relationship with the theater world, specifically with ballet. Eight of his works that were fully produced include: Bacanal, Laberinto, Café de Chinitas, Coloquio sentimental, Loco Tristan, El sombrero de tres picos, Don Juan Tenorio y Gala.

== Dance in Dalí’s paintings ==
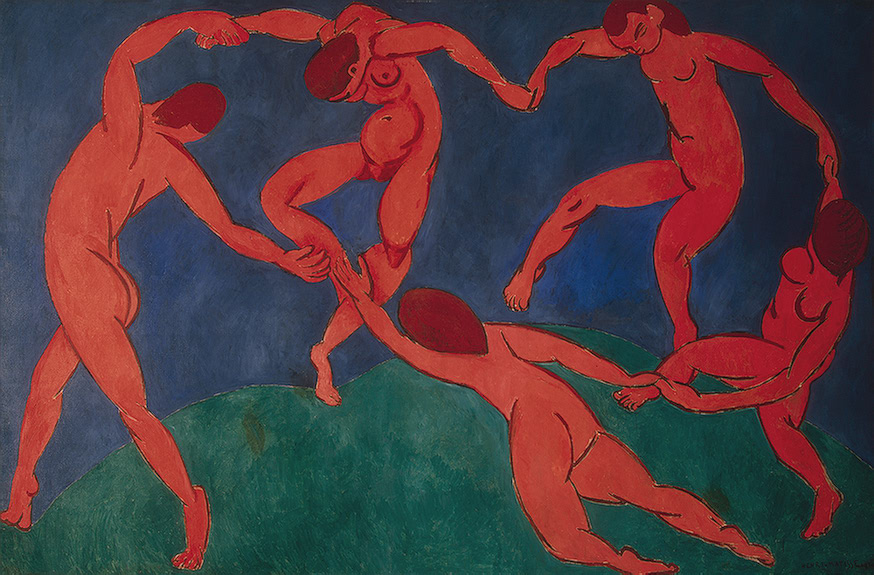
La danse, by Henri Matisse (1910), The Hermitage, St Petersburg

The theme of dance often appears in his art work. Examples of art where some form of dance is present include: young people dancing the sardana in Fiesta de Santa Lucia (1921); what appear to be people dancing in Ninfas en un jardín romántico (1921); and Composición satírica (1923), a work clearly inspired by Matisse’s La Danse.

In the painting Rompecabezas de otoño, there appear to be girls wearing tutus. Based on Dalí’s autobiography, where he narrates his escape from the revolution in Barcelona in 1935, there was a moment when he was about to be killed and in the background he could hear the sound of a phonograph playing El Bello danubio azul ("The Blue Danube"); critics believe that this moment inspired Rompecabezas de otoño.

The person posing in El escritorio antropomorfo (1936) models a typical dance pose that was popularly practiced in the Limón technique (“José Limón's approach to dance is based on the technique and movement philosophy of Doris Humphrey, who was his mentor and his artistic adviser. The movements of Doris Humphrey take their forms from the natural movements of the human body and they take their rhythms from breathing”).

The placing of the people in El pasillo de talia de palladio (1937) resembles that of a dance choreography.

In Impresiones de Africa (1938) to the right of the portrait there appears to be a man playing the guitar. He sits on the edge of a fishing boat and gazes in the direction of another person who looks as if they are dancing to the music.

Bailarina en una calavera (1939) is a painting of a dancer in a tutu within skull. Toward the end of the 30s and 40s Dalí began to paint a series of these double images.

In El puente roto del sueño (1945) there are various figures who appear to be dancing over the bridge of Avignon.

Dalí's fascination with ballet undoubtedly influenced much of his art work. “For Dalí ballet meant the ordering of moving bodies in relation with cosmic laws that govern the celestial bodies,” in other words, it was a representation of the world as it should be.
