= Young Virgin Auto-Sodomized by the Horns of Her Own Chastity =

1954 painting by Salvador Dalí

- Artist: Salvador Dalí
- Year: 1954
- Medium: Oil on canvas
- Movement: surrealism
- Dimensions: 40.5 cm × 30.5 cm (15.95 in × 12 in)
- Location: Private collection, Paris

Young Virgin Auto-Sodomized by the Horns of Her Own Chastity is an oil painting by Salvador Dalí from 1954.

== History and description ==
During the 1950s, Dalí painted many of his subjects as composed of rhinoceros horns. Here, the young virgin's buttocks consist of two converging horns and two horns float beneath; "as the horns simultaneously comprise and threaten to sodomise the callipygian figure, she is effectively (auto) sodomised by her own constitution."

Dalí's inspiration for the image appears to have come from Johannes Vermeer, one of a handful of artists regarded by Dalí as masters. Specifically, Vermeer's The Lacemaker seems to have been the galvanising element, with its convergent curves which focus on the subject's fingers and so to the penetration point of her needle — which, as Dalí has pointed out, is merely implied and not actually painted.

The painting recalls his depiction of his sister Ana María in "Young Woman at a Window" (1925), and has therefore been read by some critics as a nasty jab at his sister, punishing her for publishing a biography on Dalí that presented a quite negative point of view; it has also been interpreted as a painting of Gala Dalí, though in fact the figure is based on a photograph from a 1930s sex magazine.

In 1958, Dalí wrote, "Paradoxically, this painting, which has an erotic appearance, is the most chaste of all." The painting was formerly in the collection of The Playboy Mansion. Playboy Enterprises sold the painting at a Sotheby's auction in London in 2003 for £1.35 million, equivalent to £2,310,000 in 2024.

== See also ==
- List of works by Salvador Dalí
