= The First Days of Spring =

1939 painting by Salvador Dalí

- Artist: Salvador Dalí
- Year: 1929
- Type: Oil and collage on panel
- Dimensions: 49.5 cm × 64 cm (19.5 in × 25.2 in)
- Location: Salvador Dalí Museum, St. Petersburg, Florida

The First Days of Spring is an oil and collage on panel painting by the Spanish surrealist Salvador Dalí, created in 1929.

== Description ==
The setting for this image is an expansive, smooth gray plane. It is elevated on the right and steps down to a lower level at the left. Clustered in the middle of this space is a variety of strange and colorful surrealist images. In the distance is the small shadowy figures of a man next to a small boy. Toward the left is a figure seated in a stool with his back turned to the entire scene.

This work was created during a time of extreme personal stress for Dalí. His father was becoming increasingly disappointed with his son's choice of profession and unorthodox behavior. The figures of the man and boy appear several times in Dalí's future works. They represent Dalí's wish to heal his relationship with his father. The seated figure on the left has also been speculated to represent the artist's father.

== See also ==
- List of works by Salvador Dalí
- 1929 in art
