= Soft Construction with Boiled Beans (Premonition of Civil War) =

1936 painting by Salvador Dalí

- Construcción blanda con judías hervidas (Premonición de la Guerra Civil) (Spanish)
- Soft Construction with Boiled Beans (Premonition of Civil War)
- Artist: Salvador Dalí
- Year: 1936
- Medium: Oil on canvas
- Dimensions: 100 cm × 99 cm (39 5/16 in × 39 3/8 in)
- Location: Philadelphia Museum of Art; Philadelphia
- Owner: The Louise and Walter Arensberg Collection
- Website: Museum listing

Soft Construction with Boiled Beans (Premonition of Civil War) (1936) is a painting by the Spanish surrealist artist Salvador Dalí. Dalí created the piece to represent the horrors of the Spanish Civil War, having painted it only six months before the conflict began. He subsequently claimed that he was aware the war was going to occur long before it began, and cited his work as evidence of "the prophetic power of his subconscious mind." However, some have speculated that Dalí may have changed the name of the painting after the war to emphasize his prophetic assertions, although it is not entirely certain.

The art historian Robert Hughes commented on Dalí's painting in his biography of Goya, stating: "Salvador Dalí appropriated the horizontal thigh of Goya's crouching Saturn for the hybrid monster in the painting Soft Construction with Boiled Beans, ... which—rather than Picasso's Guernica—is the finest single work of visual art inspired by the Spanish Civil War."

== Description ==
The painting is oil on canvas and is located in the Philadelphia Museum of Art. Dalí painted it in 1936, but there are studies dating back to 1934.

== Salvador Dalí and the Spanish Civil War ==
Dalí and his wife, Gala, were trapped in the middle of a general strike and an armed uprising by Catalan separatists in Catalonia in 1934, an incident which may have influenced his Spanish Civil War motif. Salvador and Gala escaped to Paris, where they were married.

Dalí and Gala had hired an escort to take them safely to Paris, but the escort died on his return because of the stresses of the Spanish Civil War. When Dalí finally returned home, his house in Port Lligat had been destroyed in the war. He was also greatly affected because his friend, Federico García Lorca, was executed in the war and his sister Ana Maria was imprisoned and tortured.

== Meaning ==
This painting expresses the destruction during the Spanish Civil War. The monstrous creature in this painting is self-destructive just as a Civil War is. This painting is not meant to depict choosing sides, although Dalí had many reasons to choose sides in the Spanish Civil War. His sister was tortured and imprisoned by communist soldiers fighting for the Republic and his good friend from art school, the poet Federico Garcia Lorca, was murdered by a fascist firing squad. Dalí also made this painting look very realistic and yet continued to bring in surreal concepts. Although humans do not have the potential to look like the creatures in this painting, it retains a realistic feel, reminding the viewer of the gravity of the ideas behind it. Dalí also brought ideas of tradition to this piece with a beautiful Catalan sky, creating a contrast to the idea of revolution. There is a significant number of boiled beans in this painting. Dalí is quoted as saying the reason he included boiled beans was "one could not imagine swallowing all that unconscious meat without the presence of some mealy and melancholy vegetable." By this he meant that there were many hardships in the war so the Spanish citizens had to do their best to deal with their problems. He played with themes of love, eating, and the war and how they are all related.

== See also ==
- List of works by Salvador Dalí
