= The Lugubrious Game =

1929 painting by Salvador Dalí

- Artist: Salvador Dalí
- Year: 1929
- Type: oil and collage on cardboard
- Dimensions: 44.4 cm × 30.3 cm (17.5 in × 11.9 in)
- Location: Private collection

The Lugubrious Game (or The Mournful Game) is a part oil painting and part collage-on-cardboard work created by Salvador Dalí in 1929. The name of the painting was given by poet Paul Éluard. It is held in a private collection.

== History ==
In 1929, several Surrealists including Paul Éluard and his wife Gala were visiting Dalí at his home in Spain. Upon seeing the Surrealist style painting, they were intrigued by it, which led to Dalí becoming an official member of the movement.

The painting was the subject of an analysis by Georges Bataille for Documents issue no. 7.

== See also ==
- List of works by Salvador Dalí
