= The Great Masturbator =

1929 painting by Salvador Dalí

- Artist: Salvador Dalí
- Year: 1929
- Medium: Oil on canvas
- Movement: Surrealism
- Dimensions: 110 cm × 150 cm (43.3 in × 59.1 in)
- Location: Museo Nacional Centro de Arte Reina Sofía; Madrid

The Great Masturbator (1929) is a painting by Salvador Dalí, painted during the surrealist movement. It is currently displayed at the Museo Nacional Centro de Arte Reina Sofía, Madrid.

== Description ==
In the centre of the painting there is a distorted human face in profile looking downwards, based on the shape of a natural rock formation at Cap de Creus along the sea-shore of Catalonia. A similar profile is seen in Dalí's more famous painting from two years later, The Persistence of Memory. A nude female figure (resembling Dalí's then-new muse, Gala) rises from the back of the head; this may be the masturbatory fantasy suggested by the title. The woman's mouth is near a thinly clad male crotch, a suggestion that fellatio may take place. The male figure is seen only from the waist down and has bleeding fresh cuts on his knees. Below the head in the centre, on its mouth, is a grasshopper, an insect Dalí referred to several times in his writings. Unlike real grasshoppers, it seems to be gigantic and has four legs rather than six. A swarm of ants (a motif often used to represent sexual anxiety in Dalí's work) gather on the grasshopper's abdomen, as well as on the prone face. In the landscape below, three other figures are arranged, along with an egg (commonly used as a symbol of fertility) and a few other features. Two of the characters in the landscape are arranged in such a way as to cast a single long shadow, while the other character is seen hurriedly walking into the distance on the peripheries of the canvas. On the back of the central head-like figure, a formation of two rocks and a potted dry plant can be seen, the pot of the plant placed over the bottom rock while balancing the other rock on top of it in an unrealistic way. This part is thought to represent the idea of escape-from-reality found in many of Dalí's other works.

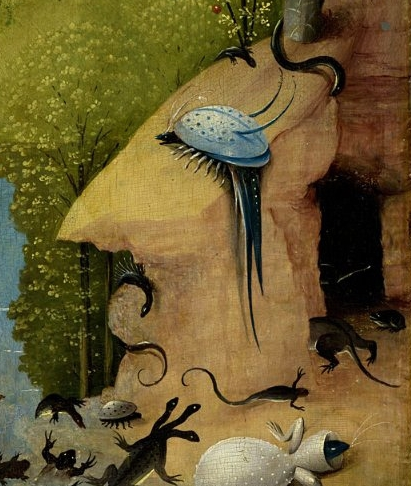
The section of Hieronymus Bosch's The Garden of Earthly Delights that has drawn comparisons with The Great Masturbator

== Interpretation ==
The painting may represent Dalí's severely conflicted attitudes towards sexual intercourse. In Dalí's youth, his father had left out a book with explicit photos of people suffering advanced untreated venereal diseases to "educate" the boy. The photos of grotesquely damaged and diseased genitalia fascinated and horrified young Dalí, and he continued to associate sex with putrefaction and decay into his adulthood.

The inclusion of the grasshopper and ants crawling on the bottom of the stone head may stem from Dalí's experience with delusional parasitosis. The disease was not first published about until 1937, however Dalí described struggling with sensations of bugs crawling on his skin in his autobiography.

In that privileged place, reality and the sublime dimension almost come together. My mystical paradise begins in the plains of the Empordà, is surrounded by the Alberes hills, and reaches plenitude in the bay of Cadaqués. This land is my permanent inspiration. The only place in the world, too, where I feel loved. When I painted that rock that I entitled The Great Masturbator, I did nothing more than render homage to one of the promontories of my kingdom, and my painting was a hymn to one of the jewels of my crown.

— Salvador Dalí

Comparisons have been made to Hieronymus Bosch's The Garden of Earthly Delights. The Great Masturbator is similar to an image on the right side of the left panel of The Garden of Earthly Delights composed of rocks, bushes and little animals resembling a face with a prominent nose and long eyelashes.

== History ==
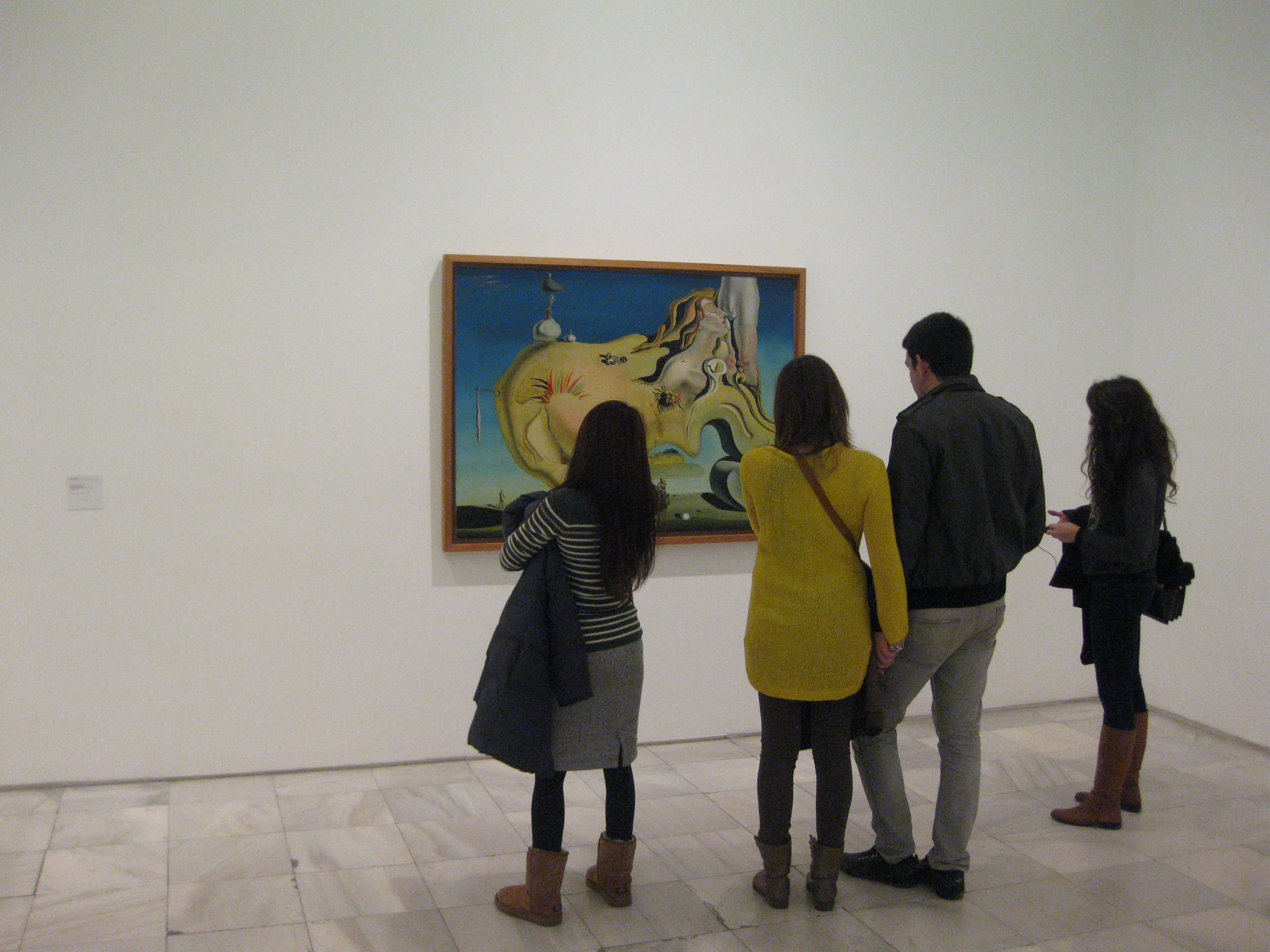
The painting on display at the Museo Nacional Centro de Arte Reina Sofía, Madrid

Dalí kept the painting in his personal collection, and displayed at the Dalí Theatre and Museum in Figueres. He bequeathed it to the national collection of Spain upon his death, when it was removed to the Madrid museum.

== See also ==
- List of works by Salvador Dalí
