= Slave Market with the Disappearing Bust of Voltaire =

1940 painting by Salvador Dalí

- Artist: Salvador Dalí
- Year: 1940
- Medium: Oil on canvas
- Dimensions: 47 cm × 66 cm (18 1/2 in × 26 in)
- Location: Salvador Dalí Museum, St. Petersburg, Florida

Slave Market with the Disappearing Bust of Voltaire is an oil painting by the Spanish Surrealist artist Salvador Dalí, from 1940. The painting depicts a slave market, while a woman at a booth watches the people. A variety of people, dressed in a 17th century fashion, seem to make up the face of Voltaire, while the face seems to be positioned on an object to form a bust of Voltaire. Voltaire was a French rationalist writer and philosopher known for his opposition to slavery.

The painting was completed in 1940. Dalí describes his work on the painting "to make the abnormal look normal and the normal look abnormal." He used the technique of the "double image", where one form contains two or more images. In the painting, two women dressed in 17-century costumes form the face of Jean-Antoine Houdon's bust of Voltaire.

== See also ==
- List of works by Salvador Dalí
