= Paranoiac-critical method =

Surrealist method developed by Salvador Dalí

The paranoiac-critical method was a surrealist method developed by Salvador Dalí from 1930 onward. It used controlled paranoiac thought to organize unrelated elements of external reality around an obsessive idea, with double and multiple images as its best-known visual form. Dalí presented it as an active alternative to automatism, and its relationship to Jacques Lacan's theories of paranoia has been debated by scholars.

== Origins ==
Salvador Dalí developed the paranoiac-critical method as an active alternative to automatism. Surrealist automatism drew on Sigmund Freud's theory of dreams and sought to release imagery of socially repressed desires into waking life, but the French Communist Party regarded its rejection of conscious control as politically passive. Dalí's method gave the artist a dynamic role in producing imagery for social critique and offered surrealism a way to retain irrational visual interpretation while actively engaging with social and political events.

Dalí first clearly articulated the method in 1930, referring in his March lecture "Moral Position of Surrealism" to a "violently paranoiac will to systematize confusion" and setting out its active character in his essay "The Rotten Donkey" that July. He developed it further in the 1932 essay "The Object as Revealed in Surrealist Experiment", the 1933 "Paranoiac-Critical Interpretation of the Obsessive Image ‘The Angelus’ of Millet", and his 1935 manifesto The Conquest of the Irrational.

In "The Object as Revealed in Surrealist Experiment", Dalí traced the surrealist object from something encountered as independent and arbitrary to something that could be acted on, manipulated and shaped by desire. He also described the objective world as the manifest content of a new dream, linking the move beyond passive dream and automatism to the developing paranoiac-critical method. Later, André Breton made a similar argument in his 1936 essay "Crisis of the Object", describing the object as open to latent possibilities that could transform it.

== Description ==
Dalí first formulated paranoia-criticism in 1930 as an active surrealist method intended to "systematize confusion" and discredit perceived reality. Rather than reproducing classical symptoms or paranoia such as persecution, Dalí proposed a controlled use of paranoiac thought that organized otherwise unrelated elements of the external world around an obsessive idea. By 1935, he defined paranoia as a "delirium of interpretative association involving a systematic structure" and paranoiac-critical activity as a "spontaneous method of irrational knowledge based on the interpretative-critical association of delirium phenomena". In this mature account, the delirious phenomenon already contained its interpretation and systematic structure, whereas critical activity subsequently revealed and objectified its images and associations.

Dalí presented the double image as an accessible visual illustration of paranoiac thought in which a single ambiguous image could be recognized as representing two different objects. Repeating the operation could produce a multiple image. He distinguished such images from the broader paranoiac-critical activity, which combined the formation of a systematic delirium with the interpretative act that revealed it. The method aimed to unsettle confidence in the stability and truth of external appearances and to make concrete irrationality seem as evident and communicable as phenomenal reality.

== Reception ==
In 1934, André Breton described Dalí's paranoiac-critical method as an "instrument of primary importance" for surrealism and linked it to the movement's faith in the "omnipotence of desire". By 1941, however, Breton had changed his view, describing paranoiac-critical activity as an unoriginal "amalgamation" of Leonardo da Vinci's method and Max Ernst's frottage. Haim Finkelstein notes that frottage is more closely related to Leonardo's method of finding forms in stains and other indeterminate visual fields than to Dalí's double and multiple images, which generally transform forms that are already well defined.

In his introduction to the 1994 edition of Jacques Lacan's The Four Fundamental Concepts of Psychoanalysis, David Macey described Dalí's theory of "paranoiac knowledge" as highly relevant to the young Lacan. After visiting Dalí in 1930 to discuss his essay "The Rotten Donkey", Lacan exchanged ideas with him on paranoia through the surrealist press. Both treated paranoia as a psychic reaction shaped by personal history and social relations rather than biological malfunction. Robin Greeley connects Dalí's account of reality as a paranoid construction to Lacan's later theory of the mirror stage and the Imaginary. Finkelstein notes that Dalí may have influenced Lacan, but says Lacan’s 1932 thesis helped Dalí reject the idea that paranoia was merely a later explanation of an initial error. Dalí instead treated delirium as already interpretive, tangible, and communicable, unlike the passivity of dreams and automatism.

== See also ==
- Delirious New York, in which Rem Koolhaas adapted Dalí's method to architecture.

== Sources ==
- Finkelstein, Haim N. (1996). Salvador Dali's Art and Writing, 1927–1942: the Metamorphoses of Narcissus. Cambridge: Cambridge University Press. ISBN 0521497477.
- Greeley, Robin Adèle (2001). "Dalí's Fascism; Lacan's Paranoia". Art History. 24 (4): 465–492. doi:10.1111/1467-8365.00278.
- Weir, Simon (3 April 2022). "Salvador Dalí in Rem Koolhaas' Delirious New York". The Journal of Architecture. 27 (2–3): 398–419. doi:10.1080/13602365.2022.2106580. ISSN 1360-2365.
