= Halsman =

Halsman is a surname. Notable people with the surname include:

- Bradley Halsman (born 1993), Scottish footballer
- Jordan Halsman (born 1991), Scottish footballer
- Philippe Halsman, Latvian-born American portrait photographer

== See also ==
- Halsman murder case, murder of Max Halsman
