= Dalí Atomicus =

1948 photograph by Philippe Halsman

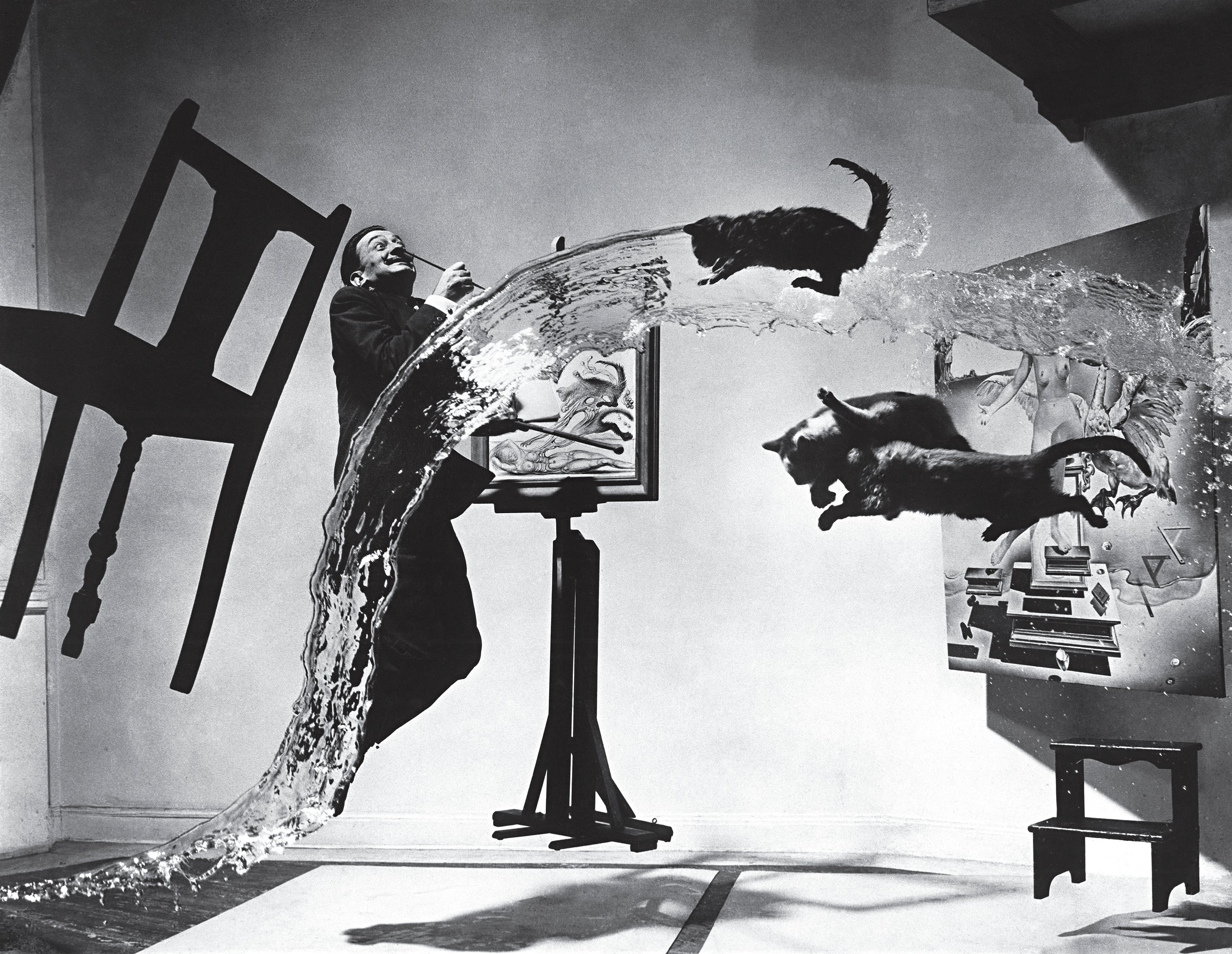
- Artist: Philippe Halsman
- Year: 1948 (78 years ago)
- Medium: Gelatin silver print
- Subject: Salvador Dalí; Three cats; A bucket of water, sans bucket; Leda Atomica (1949)
- Dimensions: 25.8 cm × 33.3 cm (10.2 in × 13.1 in)

Dalí Atomicus is a surreal photograph of the artist Salvador Dalí jumping, taken by the photographer Philippe Halsman in 1948. The photograph also features three cats flying through the air.

At least 26 takes of the photograph were made before Halsman was satisfied with the result. (Note: Sources disagree with exactly how many takes there were: some state that there were 26, while others 28. Halsman himself wrote that it took 28 attempts.) The process took between five and six hours. The final version was published in Life magazine, along with some outtakes.

Time magazine considers Dalí Atomicus one of the "100 most influential photographs ever taken".

== Background ==
Dalí said, "I have an idea. Let's take a duck and put some dynamite up his derriere and blow him up." And my father said, "Oh you can't do that. You're in America. You might get arrested ...."

— Irene Halsman, daughter of the photographer

Spanish artist Salvador Dalí, a Surrealist, first met American photographer Philippe Halsman in New York City in 1941, when the photo agency Black Star assigned Halsman to photograph the installation of one of Dalí's exhibitions at the Julien Levy Gallery in April. The two met again in October, when Halsman photographed the costumes Dalí made for a ballet at the Metropolitan Opera House. A photo Halsman took on a city rooftop, of the ballerina Tamara Toumanova with another dancer dressed in an oversized rooster costume, had elements of surrealism common in Dalí's own visuals. The image became Life magazine's "Picture of the Week", and solidified the friendship between the two.

For decades afterward, the two artists would collaborate at least once every year. Halsman's daughter Irene described the relationship between the artists as non-competitive, as Dalí was not interested in taking photographs himself, nor Halsman interested in painting. Philippe Halsman recalled that whenever he had a crazy idea, he would often bring it up with Dalí, knowing that he would be a willing subject, while whenever Dalí came to him with an absurd idea, he would try to find a way to make it work.

When the two artists met in 1948 to collaborate for Dalí Atomicus, Dalí had been working on the painting Leda Atomica (1949) since 1945. The painting played with the theme of suspension; its title referenced how protons and electrons were suspended in an atom by their constant repulsion, a subject of interest during the Atomic Age. Inspired by the painting, the two played with the idea of having things suspended in the air for the photograph. Dalí originally suggested blowing up a live duck with dynamite. Halsman was not as keen on that specific idea, and the two later decided to have furniture, water, cats, and Dalí himself appear suspended in midair for the picture.

== Description ==
Dalí Atomicus features Salvador Dalí jumping into the air as three cats fly past him. A bucket's worth of water courses through the air after the cats. Behind Dalí is an easel, on which is an image reminiscent of the flying cats. A chair is on the left side of the frame, and Leda Atomica and a step stool are on the right. The chair, the easel, Leda Atomica, and the step stool all appear to be floating in midair.

Commenting on the photo's composition, The New York Times art critic Roberta Smith remarked: "For once Dalí's characteristic look of exaggerated surprise makes sense."

== Method ==
My assistants and I were wet, dirty, and near complete exhaustion – only the cats still looked like new.

— Philippe Halsman, after the shoot

The scene was set up at Halsman's studio in New York City. To take the photograph, Halsman used a 4×5 twin-lens reflex camera that he had designed himself. The chair at the left was held up by an assistant. (Note: The University of Michigan Museum of Art reports that Halsman's wife Yvonne was one of the assistants who took turns holding up the chair.) Both the painting Leda Atomica and the easel behind Dalí were suspended by wires. The step stool was supported by a prop.

Real cats and real buckets of water were used. Halsman also had assistants help him throw the cats and the water. (Note: The photograph required the help of five assistants, including Halsman's wife. Halsman's daughter Irene recalled being one of the cat-throwing assistants.) To coordinate the assistants, Halsman counted to four. On three, the assistants threw the cats and the water. On four, Dalí jumped.

The coordination and timing was difficult to get right. For example, one take was ruined because Dalí jumped too late, another because the chair obstructed Dalí's face, and a third because someone else accidentally entered the frame. At least 26 takes were made before Halsman was satisfied with the final photograph. After every take, Halsman went into the darkroom to develop and print the film, while the assistants collected and dried the cats. The whole process lasted between five and six hours.

External image
- A few of the spoiled takes

When the photographs were being taken, the easel behind Dalí held only an empty frame. After the final photograph was chosen, Dalí painted, directly on the print, to produce the image shown.

The final version was published in Life in 1948, along with some of the spoiled takes.

== Legacy ==
External images
- Richard Nixon jumping for Halsman
- Audrey Hepburn jumping for Halsman

The photograph inspired Halsman to ask later subjects of his photographs to jump for him. Willing subjects included Audrey Hepburn, Ed Sullivan, Grace Kelly, Harold Lloyd, J. Robert Oppenheimer, Jack Dempsey, Marilyn Monroe, Richard Nixon, and the Duke and Duchess of Windsor. Halsman called the practice "jumpology", and explained how it allowed him to better capture the true character of his photographic subjects: "When you ask a person to jump, his attention is mostly directed toward the act of jumping, and the mask falls, so that the real person appears."

In 2016, Time magazine named Dalí Atomicus one of the "100 most influential photographs ever taken". Time credits Halsman for transforming portrait photography, as prior to Halsman, there was generally a certain distance between the subject and the photographer. The New York Times called Dalí Atomicus "probably Halsman's most memorable single work".

== Gallery ==
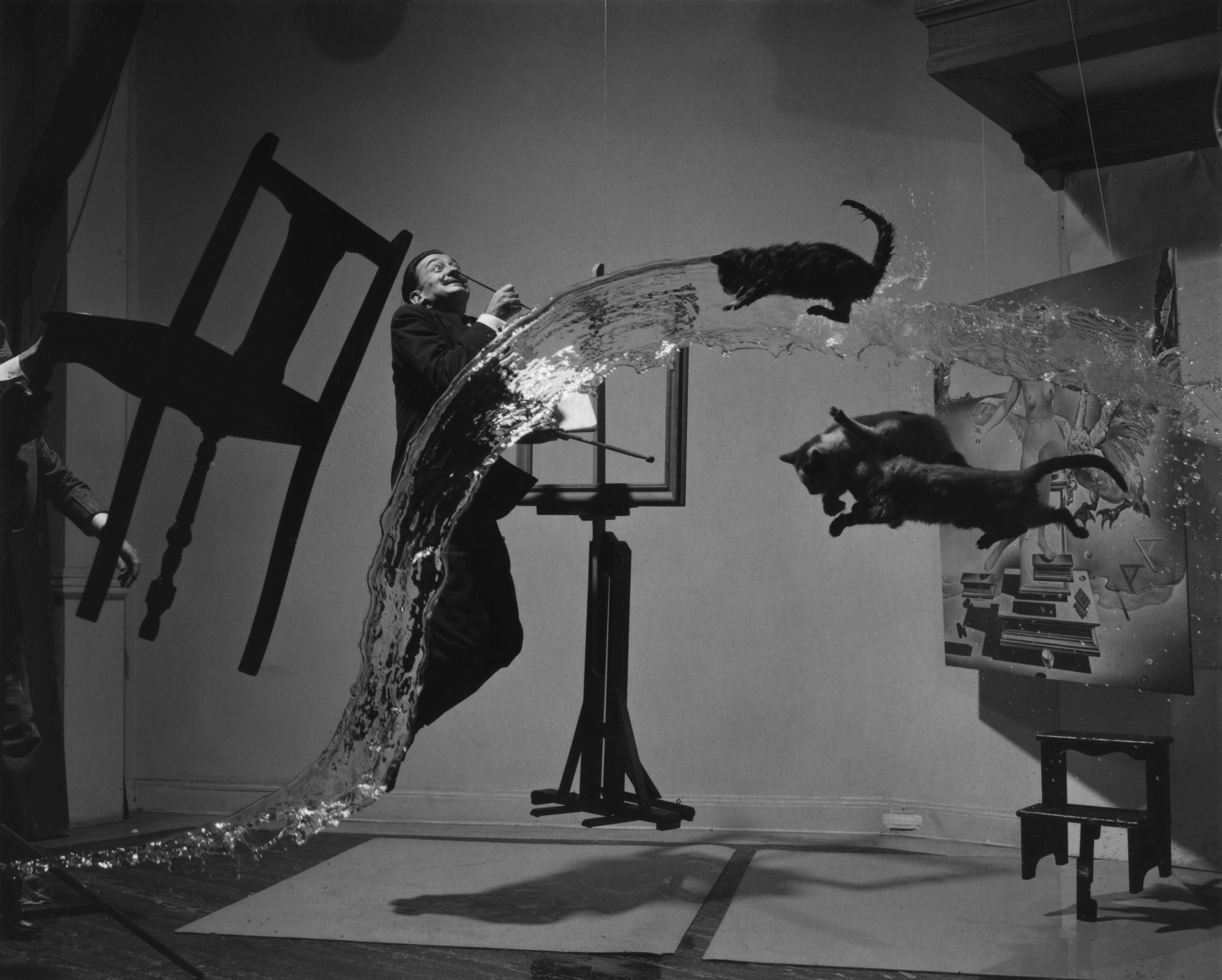
The unretouched photo

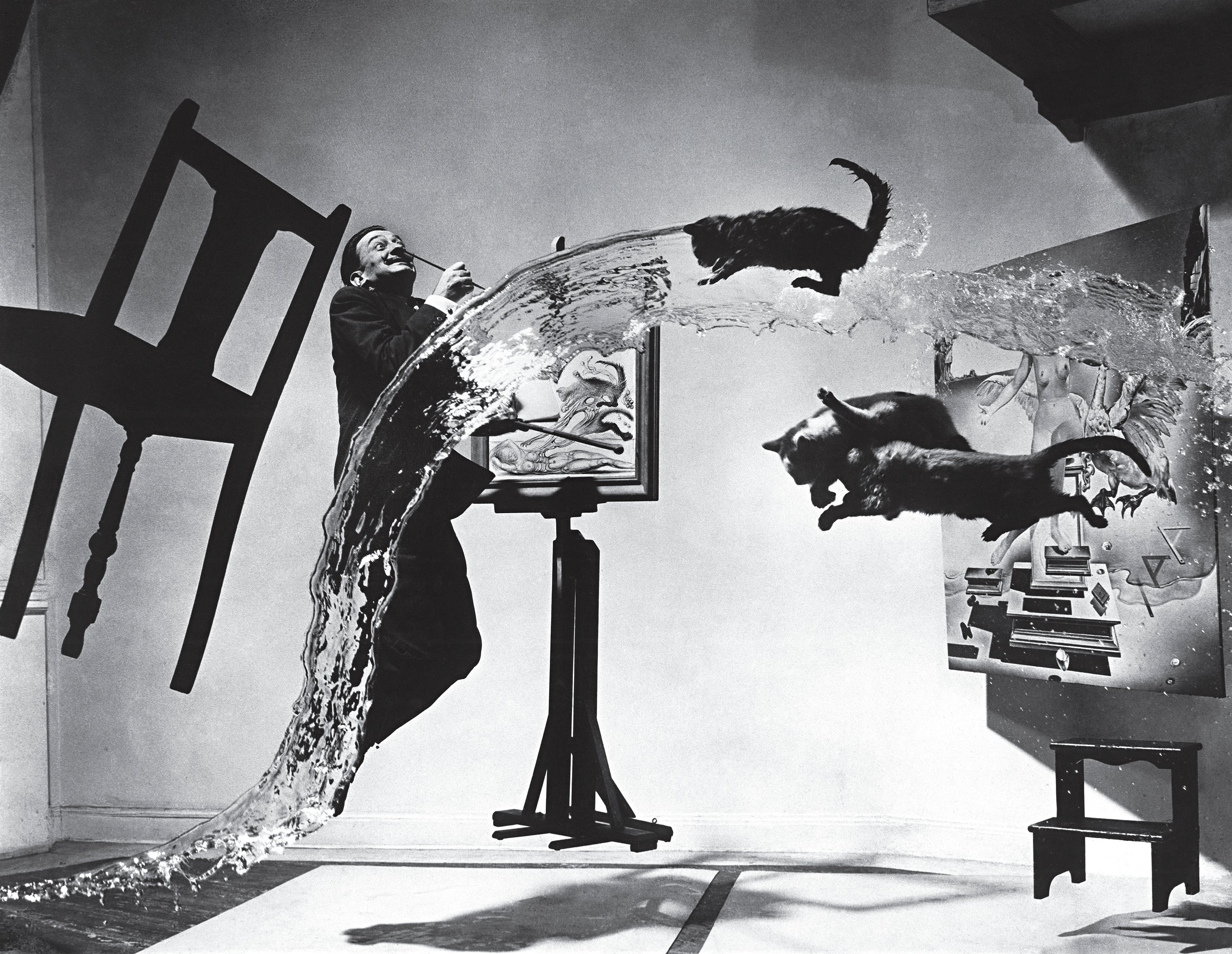
The final version
In the unretouched photo, there are wires holding up both Leda Atomica on the right, and the easel behind Salvador Dalí in the center. The assistant holding up the chair on the left is also visible, as well as the prop holding up the step stool. The easel is empty in the unretouched photo, as Dalí painted, directly on the print, the image that appears in the final version.

== See also ==
- List of photographs considered the most important
