= Jump! (2007 film) =

Jump
- Directed by: Joshua Sinclair
- Written by: Ryan James; Joshua Sinclair
- Produced by: Joshua Sinclair
- Starring: Ben Silverstone; Patrick Swayze; Martine McCutcheon
- Cinematography: Gianlorenzo Battaglia
- Edited by: David Purviance
- Music by: Kevin Kaska
- Production company: LWB Media
- Distributed by: LWB Media
- Release dates: June 2007 (Shanghai); 19 June 2008
- Running time: 118 minutes
- Countries: United Kingdom; Austria
- Language: English

Jump! is a 2007 British-Austrian drama film written and directed by Joshua Sinclair and starring Ben Silverstone, Patrick Swayze and Martine McCutcheon. It is loosely based on the real-life Halsman murder case. The film was premiered during the 2007 Shanghai International Film Festival.

== Synopsis ==
Set in Austria, in 1928, with the spectre of Nazism on the rise, a young Jew, Philippe Halsman, is accused of patricide after his father's death during a hike through the Alps. His strained relationship with his father, and the apparent evidence that he has been struck on the head with a rock, point towards the son's guilt. Halsman is put on trial, in Innsbruck, where his case is taken up by one of the country's leading lawyers.

== Cast ==
- Ben Silverstone as Phillippe Halsman
- Patrick Swayze as Richard Pressburger
- Martine McCutcheon as Liuba Halsman
- Stefanie Powers as Katherine Wilkins
- Sybil Danning as Anna Gruber
- Heinz Hoenig as Morduch Halsman
- Anja Kruse as Ita Halsman
- Heinz Trixner as Emil Groeschel
- Christoph Schobesberger as Siegfried Hohenleitner
- Richard Johnson as Judge Larcher
- Wolfgang Fierek as Leopold Zipperer
- Adi Hirschal as Dr. Stein
- Alf Beinell as Franz Eicher
- Christian K. Schaeffer as Johan Weiler
- Erik Jan Rippmann as Josef Eder
- Cornelia Albrecht as Marilyn Monroe
- Bernd Jeschek as Josef Weil

== Production ==
Producer Lily Berger has stated that she wanted the movie to serve as a "definitive account of what happened" and that she hoped that it "helps to rehabilitate Philippe Halsman’s name once and for all." The film had a budget of approximately six million Euros. Filming took place partially in Innsbruck, Austria during 2006 and 850 extras were hired for Jump!. Berger has stated that Swayze considered the film "his most important work".

== Reception ==
LA Weekly panned the film, calling it "Handsomely produced but dramatically inert." Linda Cook reviewed the movie for the Quad City Times, praising the performances of Silverstone and Swayze.
