= Ryan James =

Ryan James may refer to:

- Ryan James (rugby league) (born 1991), Australian rugby league footballer
- Ryan James (actor) (born 1975), American screenwriter, actor and voice over artist
- Ryan James (soccer) (born 1994), Canadian soccer player
- Ryan James (rugby union) (born 1999), American rugby union player
- Ryan James Wedding (born 1981), Canadian alleged drug trafficker and former Olympic snowboarder
