= Ryan James (actor) =

American actor

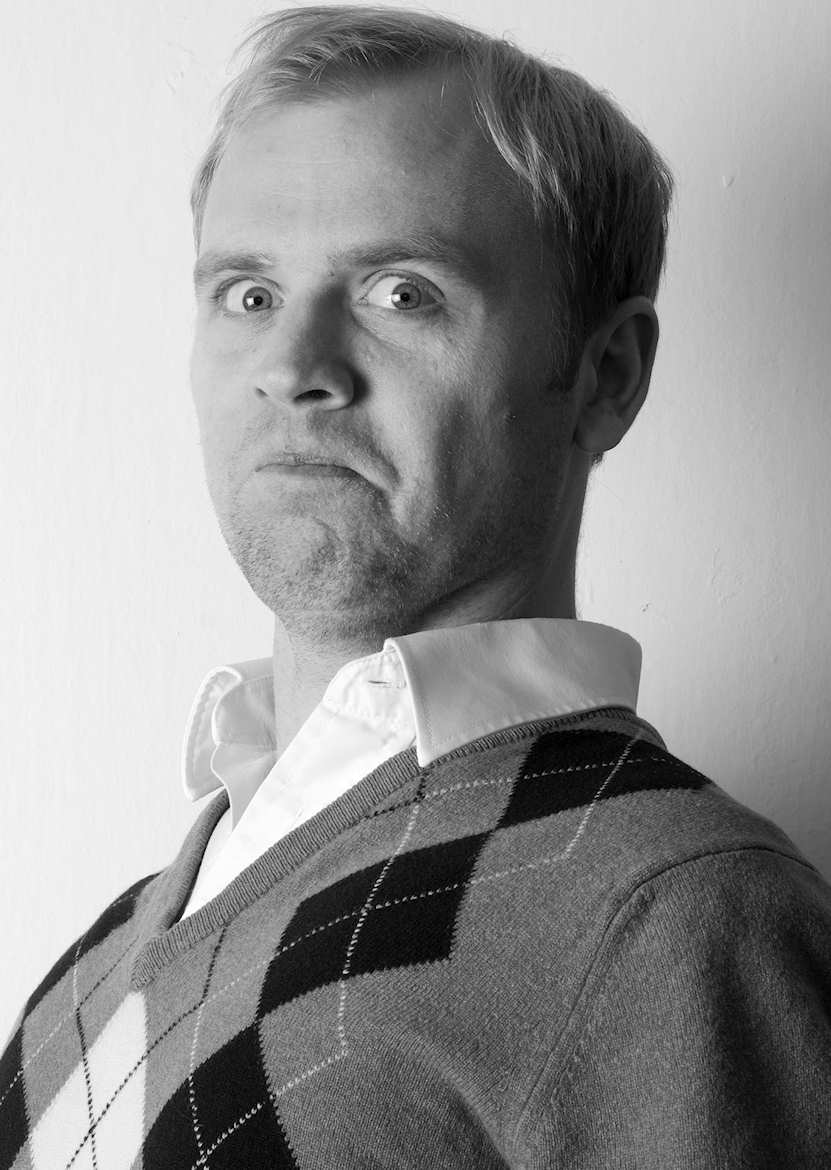
- Born: December 29, 1975 (age 50); Portland, Oregon, U.S.
- Occupations: Actor, screenwriter, voice over artist
- Years active: 2000–present
- Website: http://www.ryanjamesworks.com/

Ryan James (born December 29, 1975) is an American comedian, author, screenwriter, actor and voice over artist.

== Film and commercial acting ==
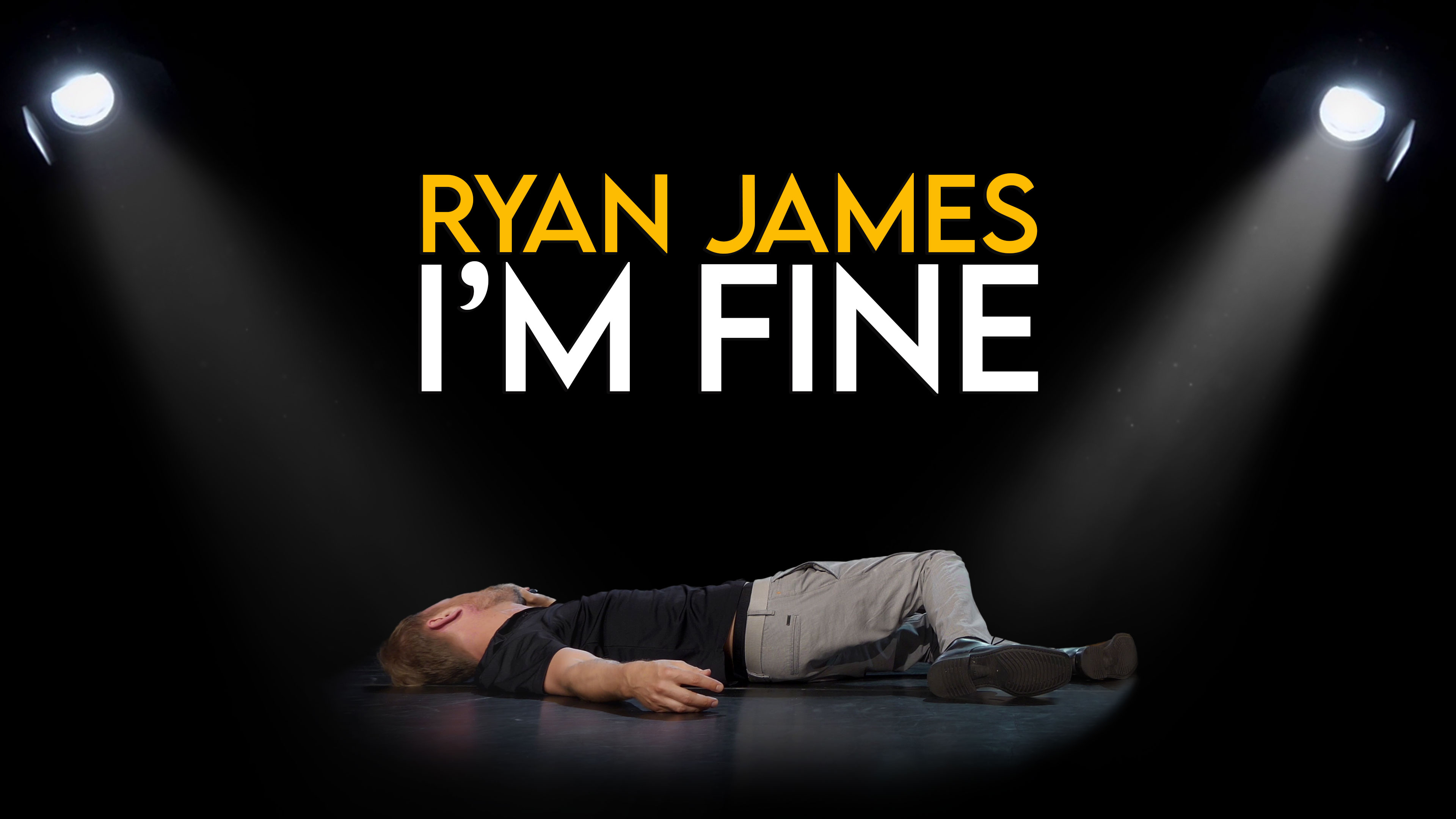
Comedy special "I'm Fine" released in 2020.

Since 2000, Ryan James has worked primarily from Europe.

He starred in comedic commercial series for Skoda and Gametap, as well as TV and radio commercials dozens of other clients. He has also performed supporting roles in several feature films including The Illusionist, Shanghai Knights, Running Scared, Solomon Kane and NBC's Revelations.

In 2020, his stand-up comedy special, "Ryan James - I'm Fine" was released by Comedy Dynamics.

== Writing ==
Initially working in 2004 as an in-house screenwriter for the straight-to-video production house North American Pictures, he advanced as a freelancer and has written several films including Jump!, the true story of Philippe Halsman, who fell victim to the anti-Semitic courts of pre-WW2 Austria, but would eventually become one of the most famous photographers of his generation.

In 2010, James started Jumper Cable Films, a crowdsourcing or grassroots-funded production company to launch its flagship film Onward, Amazing People!, a post-apocalyptic comedy.

He has authored several fiction titles under the banner of Bad Poet Press.

== Voiceovers ==
In addition to providing multiple character voices for several games developed by Bohemia Interactive like Operation Flashpoint and the widely acclaimed Arma series (where his full body image was digitized to play the Sniper), he has worked for dozens of voice over studios. In 2009, he started his own studio, Pitch Perfect Studios, and in 2011 launched an audiobook business, World Classic Audiobooks, that produces literature in the public domain.

In May 2011, he launched the Atheist Audio Bible, an online audio book version of the King James Bible presented as a work of literature read by an atheist. Unashamed and provocative, the sites offer atheists access to the Bible free from Christian proselytism, and promotes free and respectful debate between believers, atheists and those who are still undecided about the Existence of God.

== Awards ==
In 2011, Ryan gathered multiple awards from Amazon.com for his work with Amazon Studios. These include Best Actor for his work for the lead character in Z-Man, as well as a dozen other side characters. He also won Best Dialogue Track for his direction and production of the film's acted dialogue, and earned another Semi-Finalist spot for Best Actor.

== Selected credits ==
=== Film and TV miniseries ===
Napoleon (2002)
Doctor Zhivago (TV serial) (2002)
Shanghai Knights (2003)
Hitler: The Rise of Evil (2003)
Lash of the Skorpion (2003)
Bound Cargo (2003)
Charles II: The Power and The Passion (2003)
Rex-patriates (2004)
Van Helsing (film) (2004)
Queen of Cherries (2004)
Revelations (TV miniseries) (2005)
Running Scared (2006 film) (2006)
The Prince and Me 2: The Royal Wedding (2006)
The Illusionist (2006 film)
Heavyweights (2007)
Resolution 819 (2008)
Solomon Kane (film) (2009)
Abel (2009)
Psych 9 (2010)
Adventurados (2015)
The Catcher Was a Spy (film) (2018)
Ryan James - I'm Fine (2020)

=== Video games ===
Operation Flashpoint (2001)
Alpha Prime (2007)
ArmA: Armed Assault (2007)

=== Screenplays ===
Jump! (film) (2009)
Run With Fear (2005)
School of Surrender (2005)
Bound Cargo (2003)

== Sources ==
- Ryan James at IMDb
- Ryan James on TV Guide
