= Philippe Halsman =

American photographer

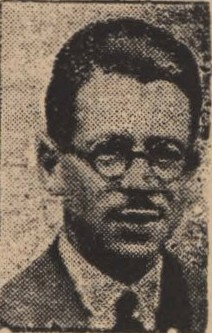
Halsman in July 1930

Philippe Halsman (Latvian: Filips Halsmans; German: Philipp Halsmann; 2 May 1906 – 25 June 1979) was an American portrait photographer. He was born in Riga in the part of the Russian Empire which later became Latvia, and died in New York City.

== Life and work ==
Halsman was born in Riga to a Jewish couple, Morduch (Maks) Halsman, a dentist, and Ita Grintuch, a grammar school principal. He studied electrical engineering in Dresden.

In September 1928, 22-year-old Halsman was accused of his father's murder while they were on a hiking trip in Tyrol, Austria, an area rife with antisemitism. After a trial based on circumstantial evidence, he was sentenced to four years of prison. His family, friends and barristers worked for his release, getting support from Thomas Mann and various important European Jewish intellectuals including Sigmund Freud, Albert Einstein, Jakob Wassermann, Erich Fromm, Paul Painlevé, Heinrich Eduard Jacob and Rudolf Olden, who endorsed his innocence. Halsman spent two years in prison, where he contracted tuberculosis. His letters from prison were published as a book in 1930: Briefe aus der Haft an eine Freundin. He was pardoned by Austrian president Wilhelm Miklas and was released in October 1930.

Halsman left Austria for France, began contributing photographs to fashion magazines such as Vogue, and soon gained a reputation as one of the best portrait photographers in France, renowned for images that were sharp rather than in soft focus as was often used, and closely cropped. When France was invaded by Germany, Halsman fled to Marseille. He eventually managed to obtain a U.S. visa, aided by family friend Albert Einstein (whom he later famously photographed in 1947).

Halsman had his first success in America when the cosmetics firm Elizabeth Arden used his image of model Constance Ford against the American flag in an advertising campaign for "Victory Red" lipstick. A year later, in 1942, he found work with Life magazine, photographing hat designs; a portrait of a model in a Lilly Daché hat was the first of his 101 covers for Life.

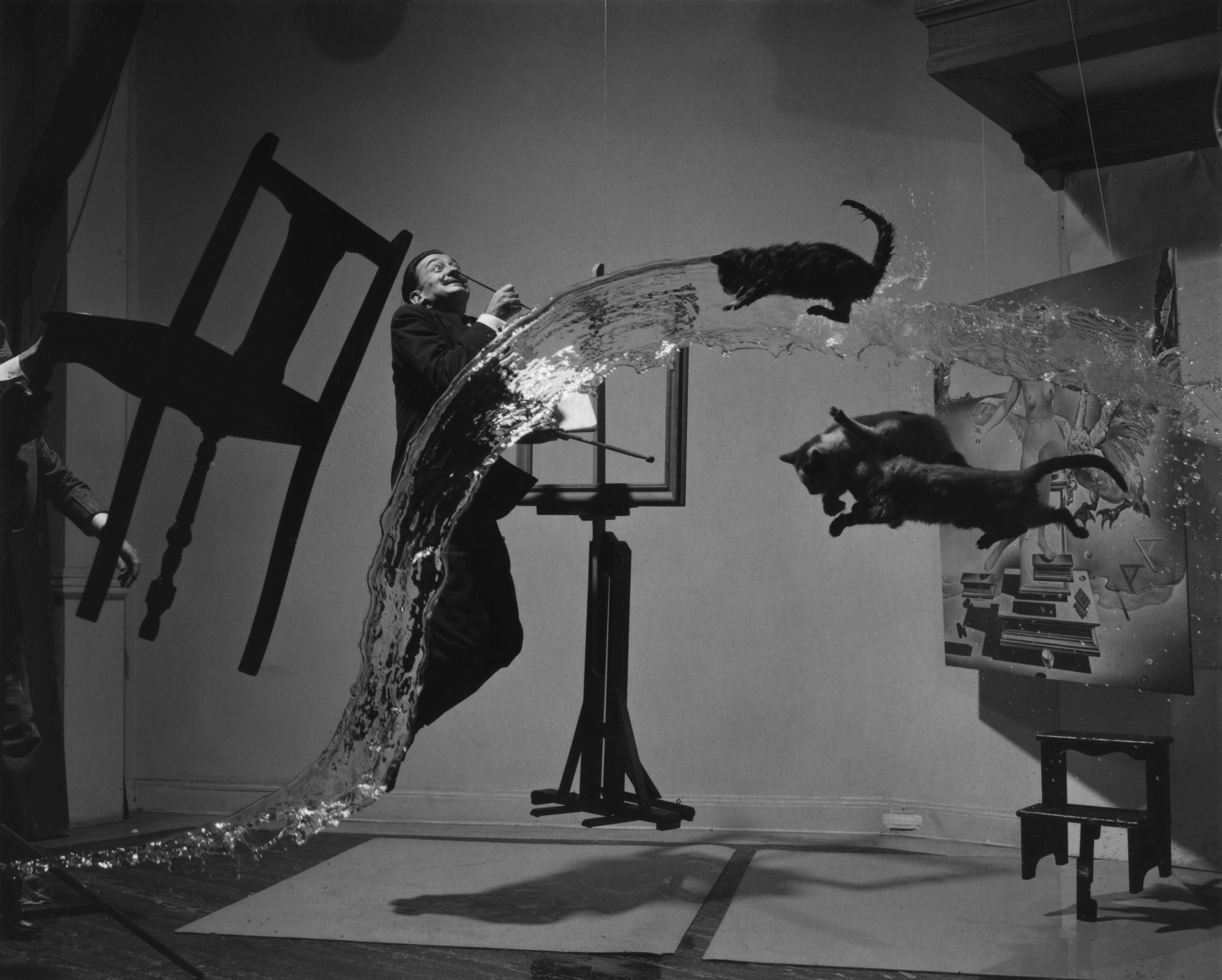
Dalí Atomicus (1948) by Halsman in an unretouched version, showing the devices which held up the various props and missing the painting in the frame on the easel.

In 1941 Halsman met the surrealist artist Salvador Dalí; they began to collaborate in the late 1940s. The 1948 work Dalí Atomicus explores the idea of suspension, depicting three cats flying, a bucket of thrown water, and Dalí in mid air. The title of the photograph is a reference to Dalí's work Leda Atomica which can be seen in the right of the photograph behind the two cats. Halsman reported that it took 28 attempts before a satisfactory result was achieved. Halsman and Dalí eventually released a compendium of their collaborations in the 1954 book Dali's Mustache, which features 36 different views of the artist's distinctive mustache. Another famous collaboration between the two was In Voluptas Mors, a surrealistic portrait of Dalí beside a tableau vivant of seven nude women posed to look like a large skull. Halsman took three hours to arrange the models according to a sketch by Dalí. Various re-enactments of and allusions to In Voluptas Mors have appeared over the years; most famously, a version was used subtly in the poster for the film The Silence of The Lambs, while an overt reenactment appeared on a promotional poster for The Descent.

In 1947 Halsman photographed a mournful Albert Einstein, who during the session recounted his regrets about his role in the United States pursuing the atomic bomb; this became one of Halsman's most famous photographs. The photo was later used in 1966 on a U.S. postage stamp and, in 1999, on the cover of Time, when it called Einstein the "Person of the Century."

In 1951 Halsman was commissioned by NBC to photograph various popular comedians of the time including Milton Berle, Sid Caesar, Groucho Marx, and Bob Hope. While photographing the comedians doing their acts, he captured many of the comedians jumping, in mid-air, which went on to inspire many later jump pictures of celebrities including the Ford family, the Duke and Duchess of Windsor, Marilyn Monroe, María Félix and Richard Nixon.

Halsman commented, "When you ask a person to jump, his attention is mostly directed toward the act of jumping and the mask falls so that the real person appears." The photographer developed a philosophy of jump photography, which he called jumpology. He published Philippe Halsman's Jump Book in 1959, which contained a tongue-in-cheek discussion of jumpology and 178 photographs of celebrity jumpers.

His 1961 book Halsman on the Creation of Photographic Ideas, discussed ways for photographers to produce unusual pieces of work by following six rules:

- the rule of the direct approach
- the rule of the unusual technique
- the rule of the added unusual feature
- the rule of the missing feature
- the rule of compounded features
- the rule of the literal or ideographic method

In his first rule, Halsman explains that being straightforward and plain creates a strong photograph.

To make an ordinary and uninteresting subject interesting and unusual, his second rule lists a variety of photographic techniques, including unusual lighting, unusual angle, unusual composition, etc.

The rule of the added unusual feature is an effort by the photographer to capture the audience's attention by drawing their eye to something unexpected by introducing an unusual feature or prop into the photograph. For example, the photograph of a little boy holding a hand grenade by Diane Arbus contains what Halsman would call an added unusual feature.

Halsman's fourth rule of "the missing feature" stimulates the viewer by going against his or her expectations.

The fifth rule enlists the photographer to combine the other rules to add originality to his or her photo.

Finally, Halsman's literal or ideographic method is to illustrate a message in a photograph by depicting the subject as clearly as possible.

Other celebrities photographed by Halsman include Alfred Hitchcock and François Truffaut during their 1962 interview, Martin and Lewis, Judy Garland, Winston Churchill, Marilyn Monroe, Dorothy Dandridge, Pablo Picasso, and Jean Cocteau. Many of those photographs appeared on the cover of Life. In such photos, he utilizes a variety of his rules of photography. For example, in one of his photos of Winston Churchill, the omission of his face makes Halsman's photo even more powerful at making Churchill more human.

In 1952 John F. Kennedy sat twice for photographs by Halsman. A photograph from the first sitting appeared on the jacket of the original edition of Kennedy's book Profiles in Courage; one from the second sitting was used in his senatorial campaign.

In 1958 Halsman was listed in Popular Photography magazine's "World's Ten Greatest Photographers", and in 1975 he received the Life Achievement in Photography Award from the American Society of Magazine Photographers, of which he was elected the first president in 1945. He also held many large exhibitions worldwide.

In 1967 Halsman received the Golden Plate Award of the American Academy of Achievement.

In the 2007 film Jump!, Halsman was portrayed by Ben Silverstone.

== See also ==
- List of TV Guide covers
