= Cap Norfeu =

Cape in Catalonia, Spain

Coordinates: 42.2434°N 3.26603°E

Cap Norfeu is a cape at the south-east end of the Cap de Creus peninsula, located on the Costa Brava in Catalonia, Spain, between the towns of Roses and Cadaqués. It forms a small, rugged peninsula, approximately 1 km long, that juts eastward into the Mediterranean Sea, separating the bay of Badia de Jóncols to the north from the Badia de Montjoi (famous for being the site of the former restaurant El Bulli) to the south.

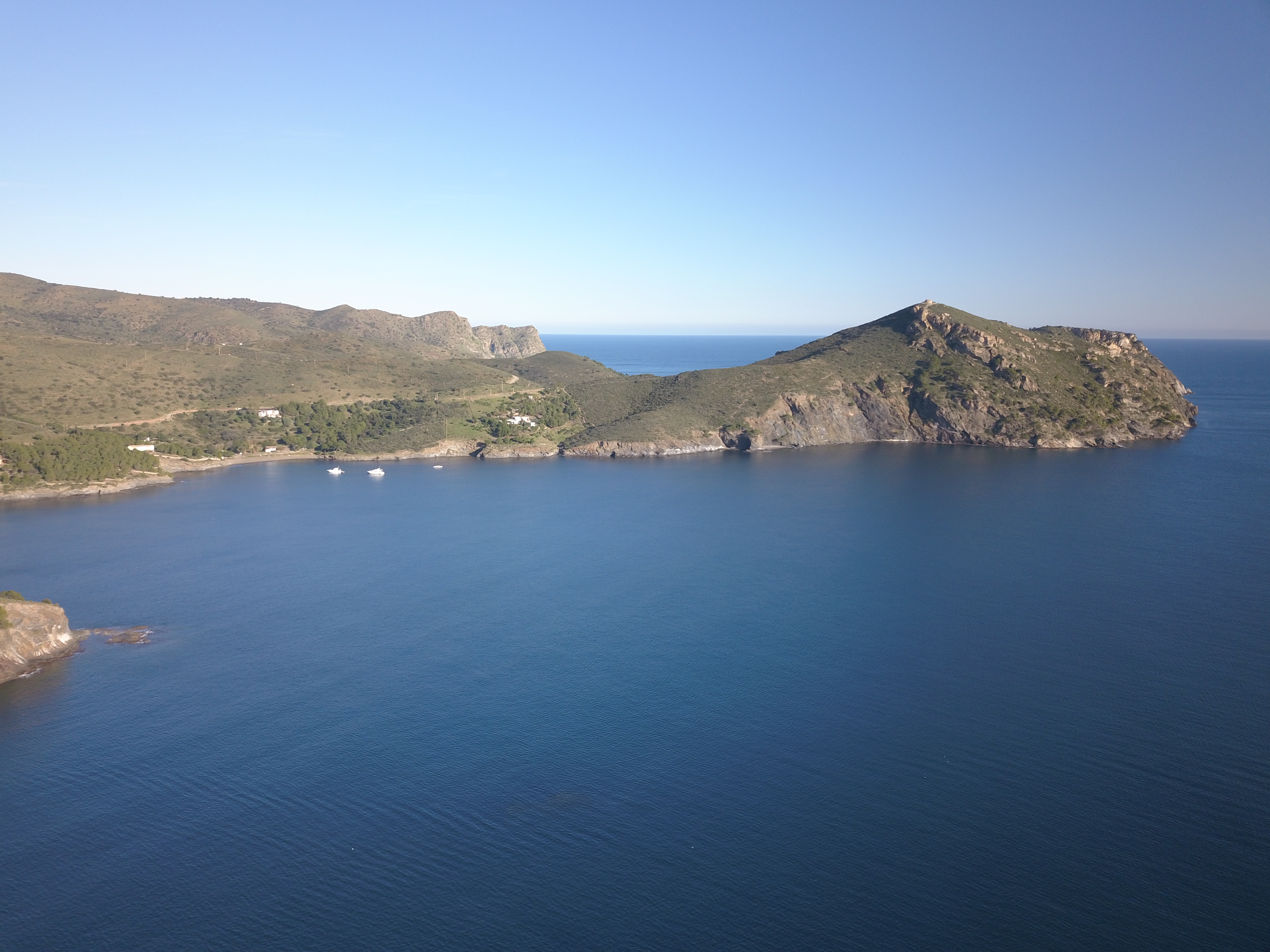
Cap Norfeu, seen from the south.

The cape is entirely within the boundaries of the Parc Natural de Cap de Creus, Spain's first maritime-terrestrial natural park. Due to its significant ecological value, the land area of Cap Norfeu itself is designated as an Integral Nature Reserve (Reserva Natural Integral), affording it the highest level of protection within the park system, meaning access may be restricted.

Geologically, Cap Norfeu is composed primarily of dark schist which has been heavily shaped by erosion, particularly by the strong Tramuntana wind common in the region. This has resulted in distinctive and sometimes zoomorphic rock formations along its cliffs. The surrounding seabed is also protected and known for its rich marine biodiversity, including gorgonian corals, making it a popular area for scuba diving.

There are also zones of metamorphosed limestone which, like the schist, are thought to be of Cambrian age. The limestone is seen, for example, at the Cova de les Ermites, on the north side of the headland.

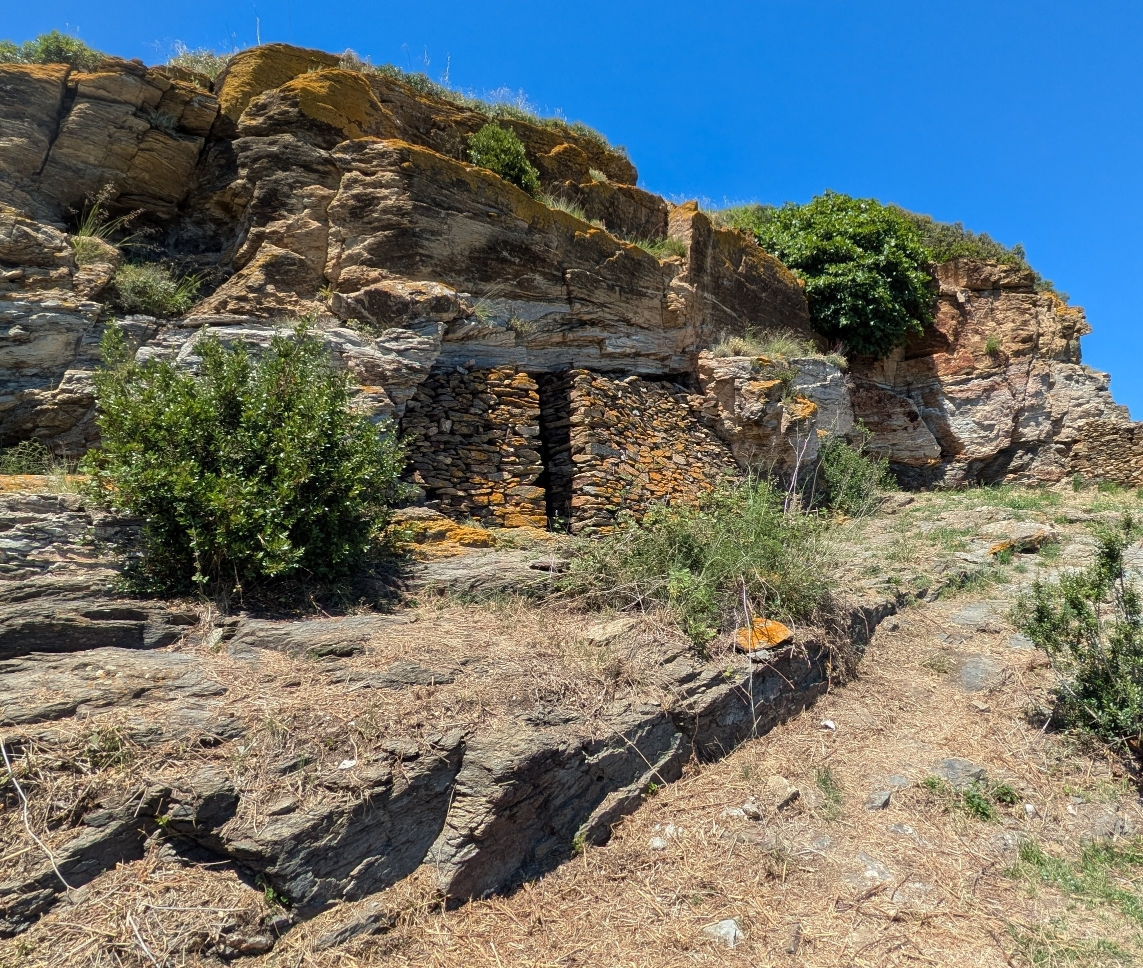
Cova (cave) de les Ermites - entrance.

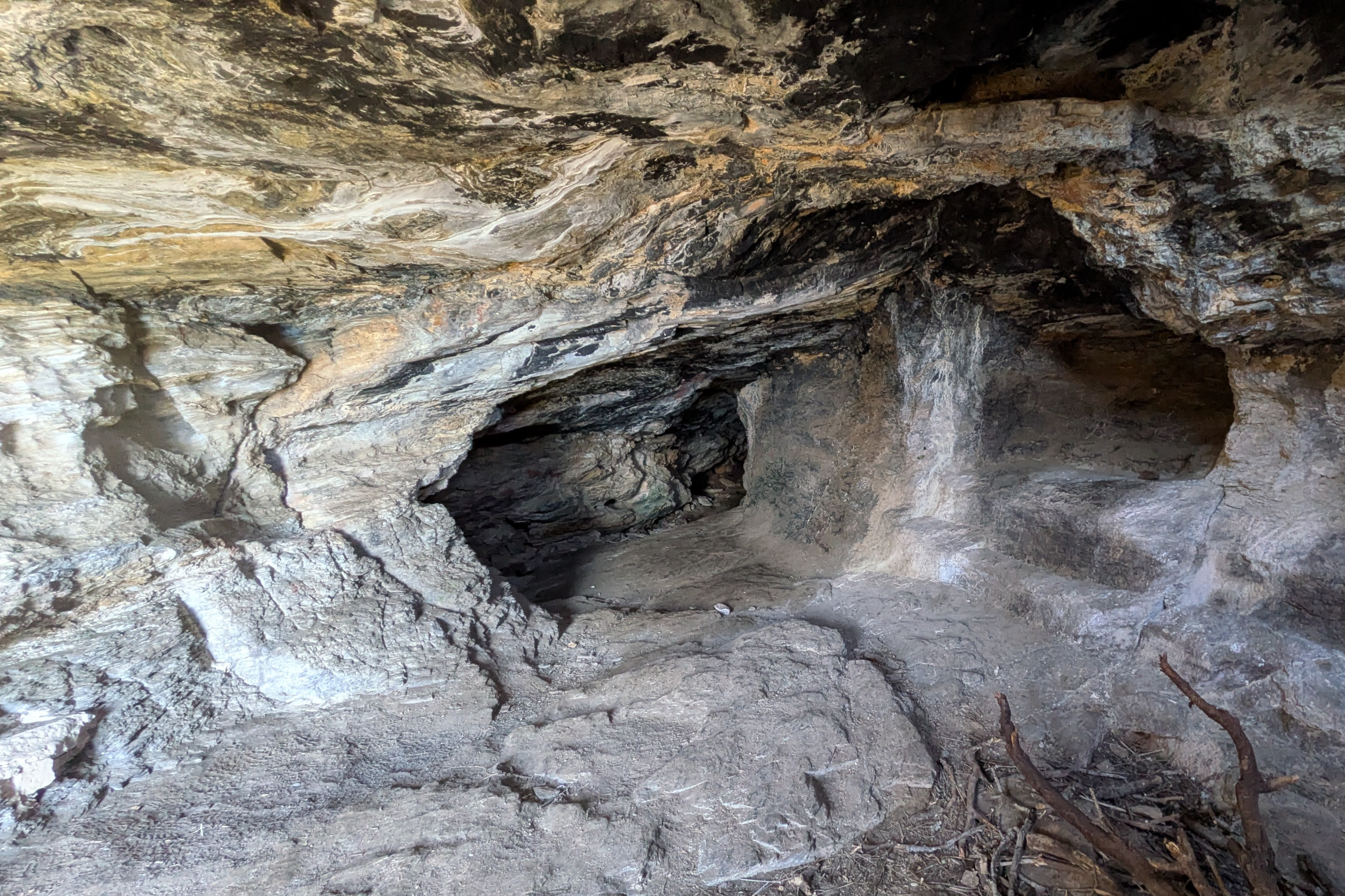
Cova de les Ermites - interior.

At the tip of the cape stand the ruins of a structure often identified as a medieval watchtower. Such towers were common along the coast as part of a defensive system against piracy during the Middle Ages and early modern period.

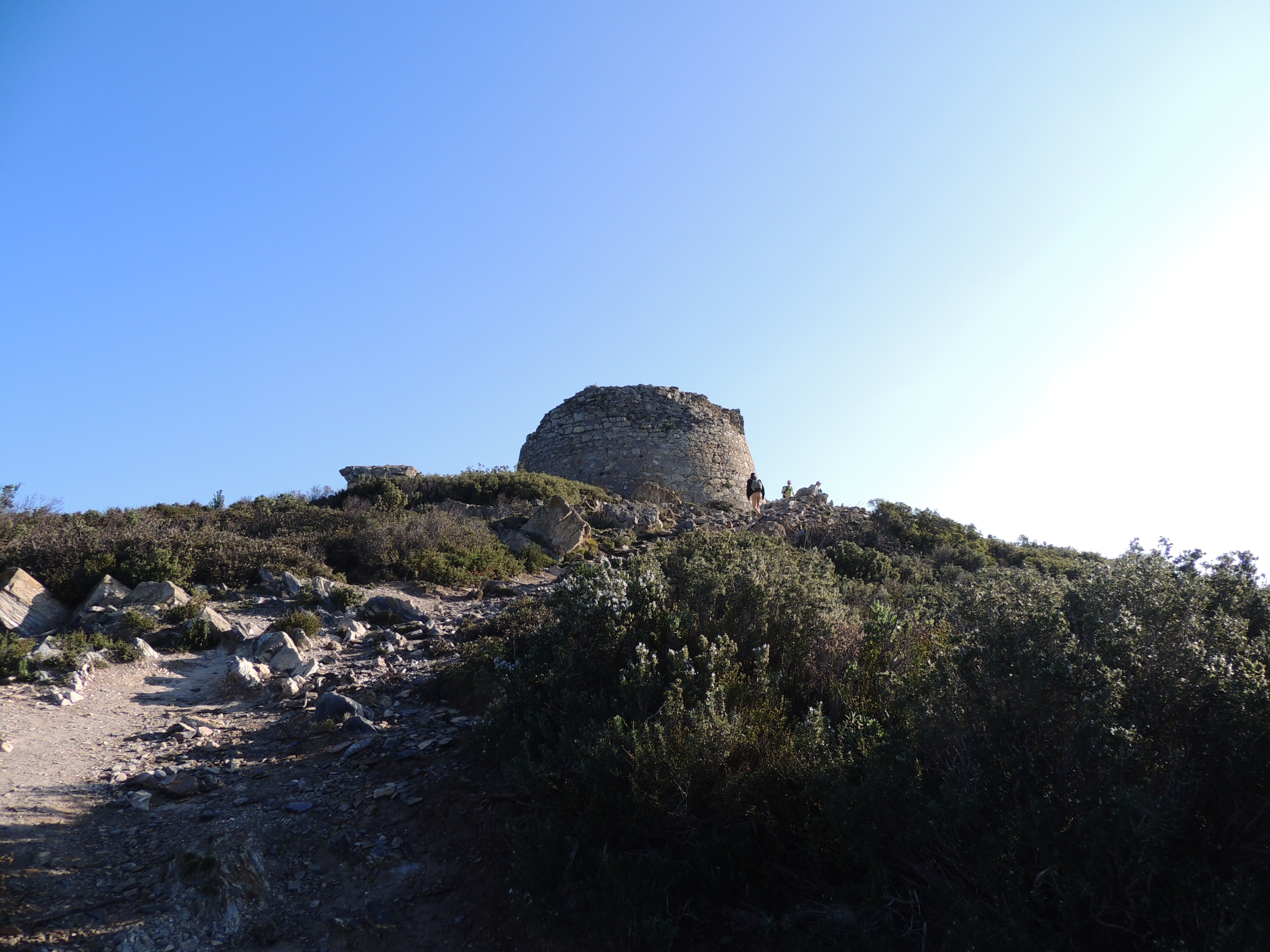
Remains of the medieval watchtower at Cap Norfeu.

Access to the cape itself is typically via boat or through hiking trails originating from Cala Montjoi or Roses, offering dramatic views of the coastline. The vegetation is characteristic Mediterranean scrubland, adapted to the wind and saline spray.
