= Step stool =

Type of free-standing ladder

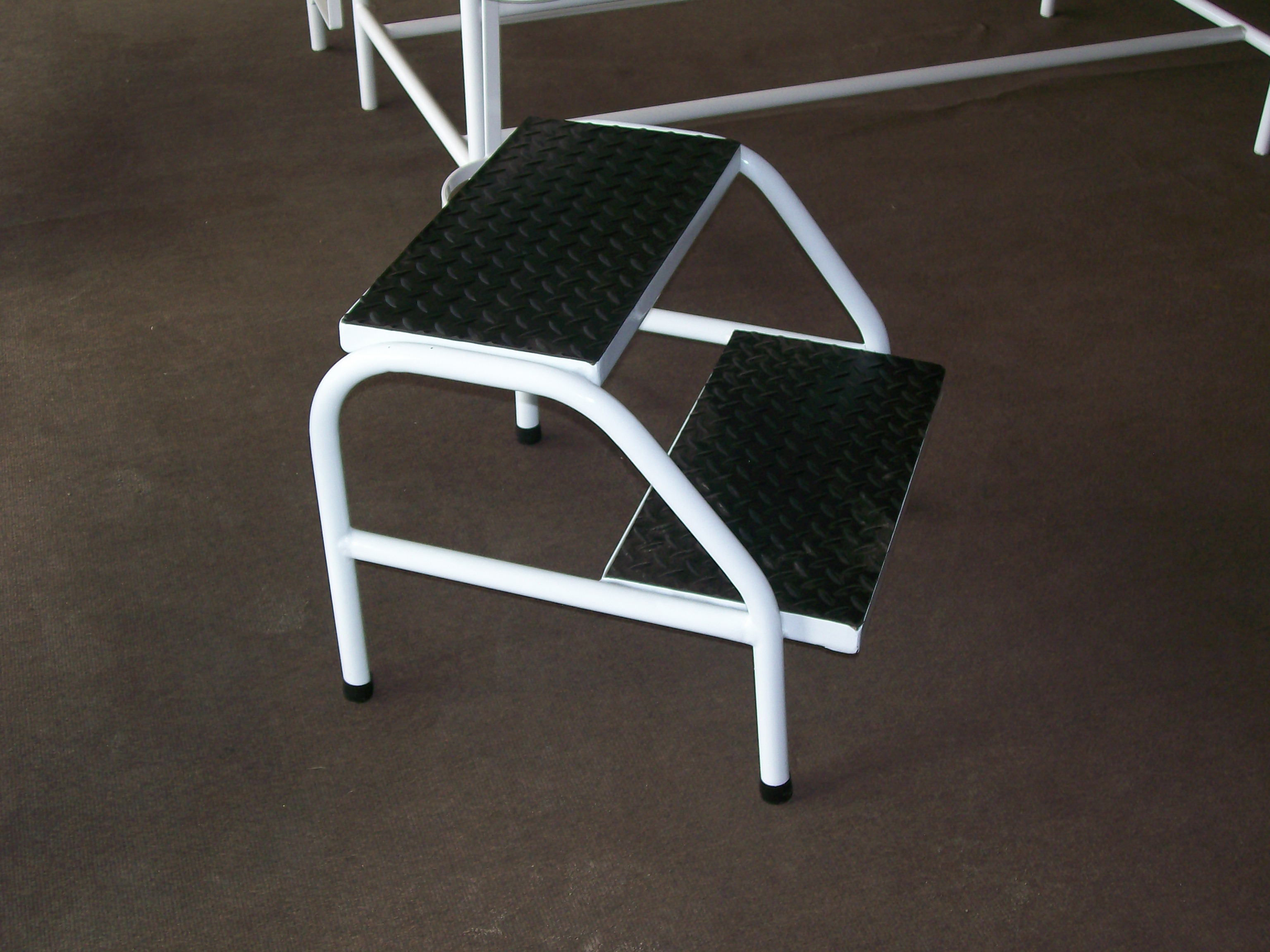
Step stool with 2 steps

Step stools are small, portable platforms designed to extend a person's reach. Often foldable for easy storage, modern step stools are typically made of aluminum, steel, plastic, or wood. They offer greater portability than full-sized ladders, but are intended for lower elevations.

== Evolution ==
From the small wooden stool, the step stool grew to allow grabbing objects from higher places. The need led to the addition of a couple of steps, first of wood, and then of light metal. The multi-step ones are also equipped with safety railings for the taller models. They are usually foldable so that they can be easily stored and transported.

To meet the needs of construction professionals, step stools have been redesigned for very specific uses, such as scaffold ladders and giraffe ladders.

== Uses ==
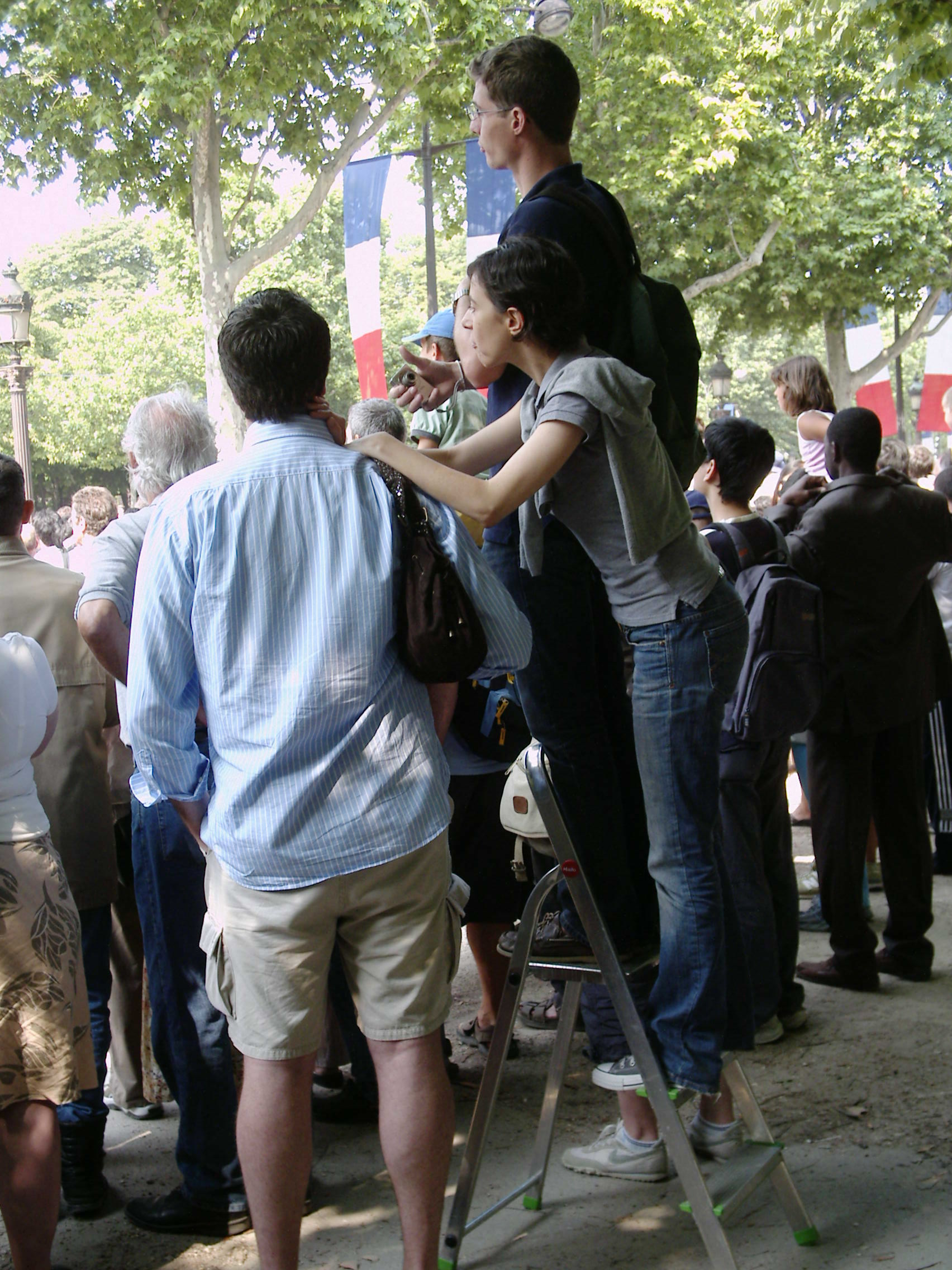
Step stool with 3 steps

Step stools have a wide range of uses, being an important aid for working at home. The ones that have a wide platform are practical for wall painters, who can even walk on the platform without having to go up & down every time they need to change their work area by a few inches. For example, they are used to change light bulbs and fluorescent lights in rooms with high ceilings, pick fruit in horticulture, and other activities. They are also used by photographers when they need a higher overall viewing point. Some models can be used as a sitting stool.

They are suitable only for use on floors with a flat surface. They are not usable on those with irregular surfaces. They can be used as a ladder while having the advantage of being more comfortable to be able to stand on its wider platform. For small heights, they are safer than a normal ladder. However, they have the disadvantage of being less stable than a "normal ladder resting on the wall", so care should be taken when using a high step stool (or folding ladder) instead of a normal ladder placed against the wall, because with an imbalance, it could tip over.

== Gallery ==
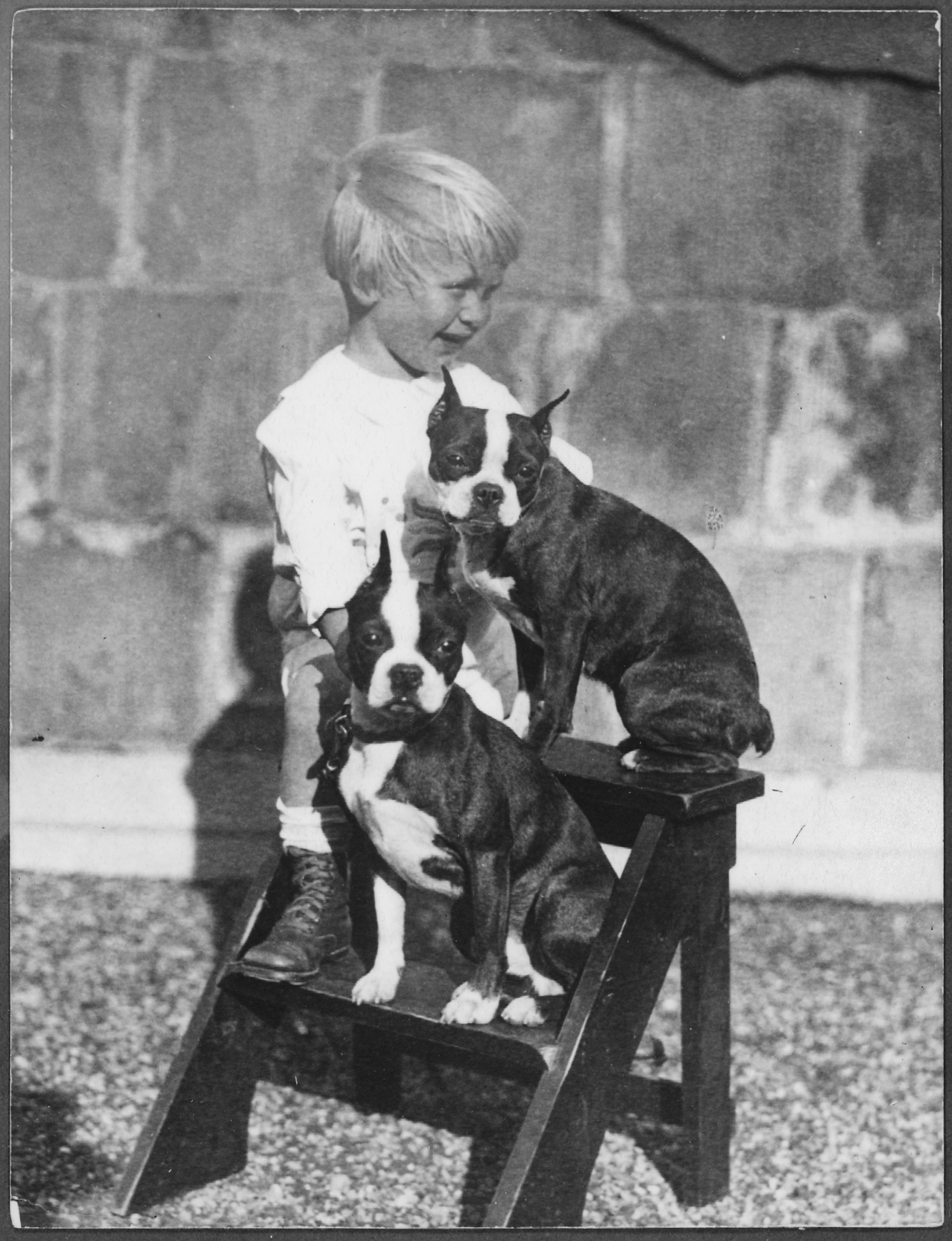
Primitive model

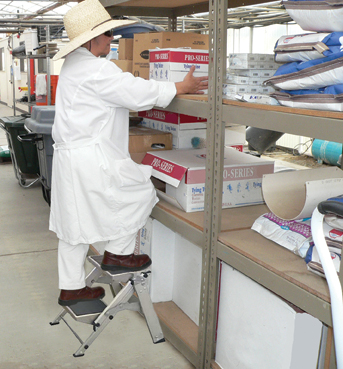
Models of 2 steps of aluminium

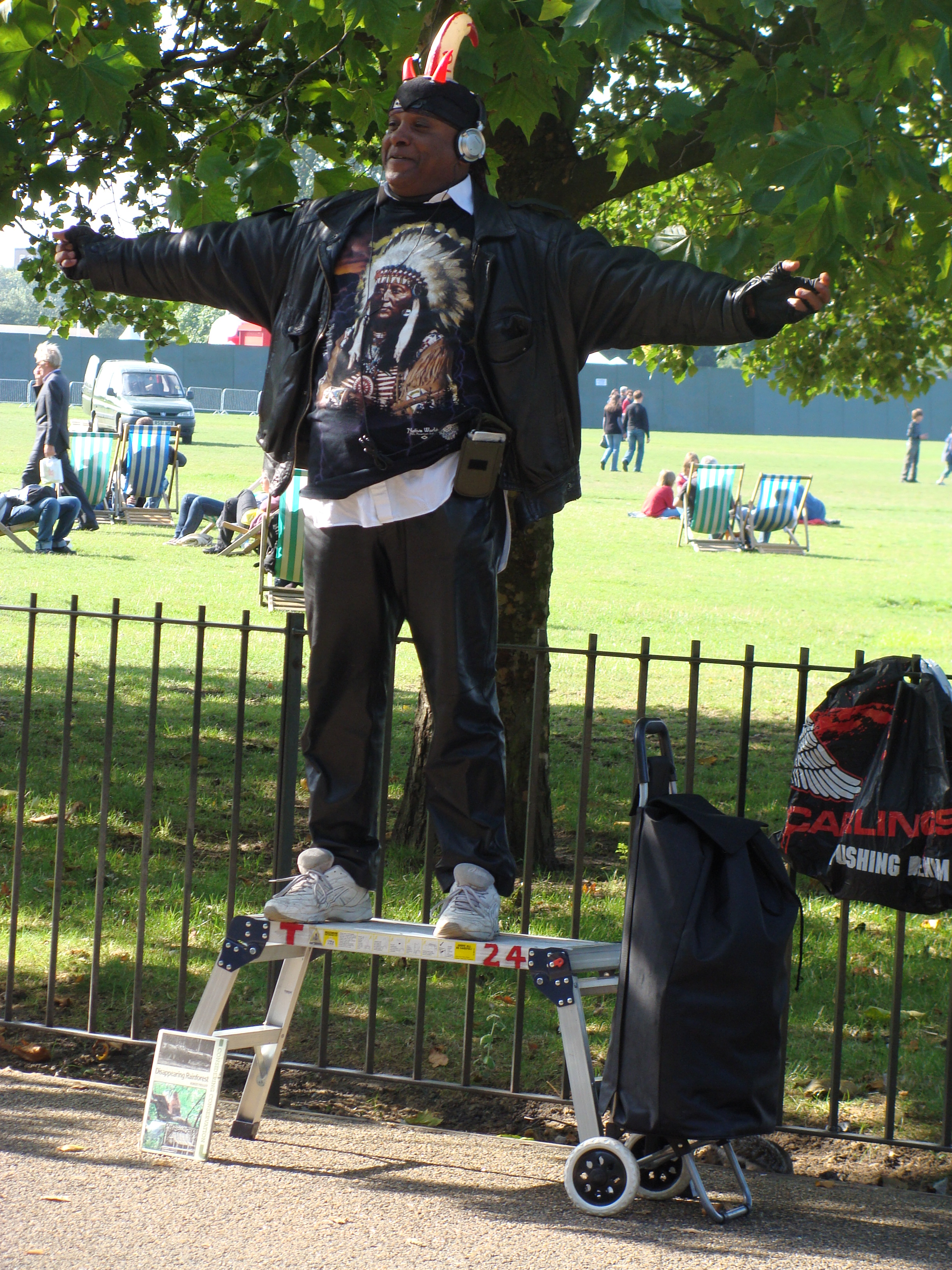
Step stool scaffold type.

== See also ==
- Monks bench, multi-functional furniture that can switch between being used as a bench or a table
- Folding chair, light, portable chair that folds into a smaller size
- Step chair, multi-functional furniture that can be used as a chair or a small set of steps or stairs
- Ladder, vertical set of rungs or steps for climbing or descending
