= Halsman murder case =

Alleged patricide case in 1920s Austria

The Halsman murder case was a major political event in Austria, when Philippe Halsman was accused of murdering his father in 1928 and sentenced in a controversial trial in Innsbruck. It demonstrated widespread antisemitism in rural Austria in the interwar period.

== Crime ==
On September 10, 1928, Latvian Jewish dentist Morduch Halsman was murdered while on a hiking tour in the Zillertal valley in the Austrian Tyrol with his son, Philippe Halsman, then a 22-year-old student of engineering in Dresden. Philippe said he was walking some steps ahead of his father, then heard a cry and saw him falling down the precipice. By the time Philippe found a path and scrambled down to the river bank below, his father had been robbed and killed. His empty wallet was found alongside the body.

A series of unsolved crimes in the area and its growing antisemitism empowered local officials, who, without evidence or motive, arrested Philippe Halsman and charged him with his father's death. The next day the body of Morduch Halsman was recovered and autopsied. Soon after, Philippe was brought to Innsbruck to stand trial.

== Trials ==
The trial began on December 13, 1928, at the Innsbruck state court. Many relatives and friends from the Halsman family's hometown, Riga, came to support Philippe, but his position was desperate from the start. The testimony against him came from witnesses in Breitlahner, the town nearby (some connected to the Heimwehr movement, a network of proto-Nazi activity) who claimed to have found Philippe's behavior at the crime scene suspicious. There was also circumstantial evidence: a stone had been found with the victim's blood and hair, but there was no evidence linking the stone to Philippe. The most powerful argument for his defense was the lack of a motive, supported by testimony of Halsman's relatives which upheld the loving relationship between father and son. The Innsbrucker Nachrichten, a local newspaper, ran a story titled "Accident or Murder?" the day after the event, and one week later ran the story “A Father Battered to Death by His Own Son". After four days of trial, the jury voted 9-3 for conviction, and Philippe Halsman was sentenced to 10 years' imprisonment in solitary confinement.

The legitimacy of that judgement was immediately challenged by journalists and legal scholars all over Austria and Germany. The Supreme Court of Austria reversed the verdict and sent the case back to Innsbruck. At the second trial on October 19, 1929, Halsman was found guilty of manslaughter and sentenced to four years of imprisonment.

== Aftermath ==
Observers of the trial noted the widespread antisemitism in Tyrol and the public condemnation of Halsman. Halsman's sister Liouba worked for his release and drew international attention to the case. Leading intellectuals of the time, among them Sigmund Freud, Albert Einstein and Thomas Mann endorsed his innocence. Freud's opinion emphasized that the Oedipus Complex, which the experts who testified at trial offered as the motive for Halsman's behavior was, in fact, universal and should not have been offered as a motive weighing toward Halsman's guilt. Finally, on October 1, 1930, Austrian president Wilhelm Miklas pardoned Halsman. Philippe left Austria for Paris, where he joined his mother and sister and began a career as a photographer. No other suspects were tried.

== See also ==
- List of unsolved murders (1900–1979)
