= The Ecumenical Council (painting) =

1960 painting by Salvador Dalí

- Artist: Salvador Dalí
- Year: 1960
- Medium: Oil on canvas
- Dimensions: 299.7 cm × 254 cm (118 in × 100 in)
- Location: Salvador Dalí Museum; Saint Petersburg, Florida

The Ecumenical Council is a surrealist painting by Spanish artist Salvador Dalí completed in 1960. It is one of his masterpieces, taking two years to complete and very large at 299.7 by 254 centimetres (118.0 in × 100.0 in). The painting is a complex assemblage of art historical references and religious scenes emphasizing Catholic symbolism.

Dalí was inspired to paint The Ecumenical Council upon the 1958 election of Pope John XXIII, as the pope had extended communication to Geoffrey Fisher, the Archbishop of Canterbury, the first such invitation in more than four centuries. The painting expresses Dalí's renewed hope in religious leadership following the devastation of World War II.

Today, it is housed in the Salvador Dalí Museum in St. Petersburg, Florida.

== Background ==
Salvador Dalí was 54 years old when he began to paint The Ecumenical Council. He was established as a surrealist with a reputation for shocking audiences with fantastic imagery, something that New York Times chief art critic John Canaday later characterized as "the naughtiness that obsessed him". His work began to take on darker, more violent overtones during World War II. Possibly spurred both by the death of his father in 1950 and his interest in the writings of French theologian Pierre Teilhard de Chardin, Dalí began to incorporate religious iconography in his work.

He was by this time an international star and able to secure an audience with Pope Pius XII. By the late 1950s, both religious and cosmic matters preoccupied his work while his canvases became especially large, as if, according to author Kenneth Wach, he was "motivated by a desire to match such admired historical antecedents as the Spanish artists Murillo, Velázquez, and Zurbarán, and thereby to secure his place in the art of the century". When a new pope was being considered in 1958, Dalí was an enthusiastic supporter of Angelo Giuseppe Cardinal Roncalli, to the extent that Roncalli's ear became the subject of his trompe-l'œil composition The Sistine Madonna (1958).

== Description ==
The Ecumenical Council is an assemblage of religious scenes and other symbols with personal significance to Dalí that he often repeated in his works. At the top center of the piece is the Holy Trinity: a youthful Father extends an arm to cover his face and is shown without genitals. Below and to the left of God is Jesus, holding a cross. The Holy Spirit floats to the right with his face obscured while a dove flies overhead. Between Jesus and the Holy Spirit is a scene from the Papal coronation. Dalí's wife Gala is shown kneeling under this area, holding a book and a cross. Beside her are the Cap de Creus cliffs. Dalí did not sign the canvas; instead he included a self-portrait in the lower left corner, looking out at the viewer as he stands in front of a blank canvas.

Dalí's The Trinity Study for The Ecumenical Council, 1960. Oil on canvas. 58.4 x 66 cm. Vatican Gallery, Vatican

The top and bottom portions of the composition are markedly different, as the figures above are not sharply defined and they blend into each other with sweeping clouds. The figures, rock, and water in the lower portion, in contrast, are clear and have distinct shapes and lines. The merging between the two parts of the canvas is Dalí's depiction of the marriage between heaven and earth. A preparatory study for The Ecumenical Council was eventually exhibited as The Trinity. Scholars debate as to who is represented by the figures in both works. The top figure, commonly recognized as God the Father, is more reminiscent of a naked, suffering Christ (the study depicts the top figure with male genitalia). The lower figures are androgynous, wearing gowns and posing with traditionally feminine attributes. The lower right figure, which is recognized as the Holy Spirit by the dove over its head, has his hands crossed, a gesture associated with the Annunciation: the revelation that Mary will give birth to Christ. It is unclear if the dove in The Ecumenical Council is a symbol of the Holy Spirit or a messenger from the archangel Gabriel.

== Influences ==
The painting represents several of Dalí's ideas on art and religion. It is heavily inspired by Diego Velázquez, and was completed in time for the 300th anniversary of his death. Dalí had long been influenced by Velázquez, and used images from The Surrender of Breda (1634–35) in his The Discovery of America by Christopher Columbus completed the previous year. As with Dalí, Velázquez painted himself into his Las Meninas (1656), at the lower left portion of the canvas looking out at the viewer with canvas and brush. The arch (St. Peter’s Basilica in Rome) under which God floats in the painting and the composition of the trinity based on Michelangelo's The Last Judgment (1537–41) are references to the art of the Renaissance.

Dalí considered some forms of 20th-century modern art "barbaric" and attempted in his art and writings to promote a more classical painting style. He wrote a book about painting titled 50 Secrets of Magic Craftsmanship (1948) in which he describes his inspiration to write it: "Now at forty-five I want to paint a masterpiece and to save Modern Art from chaos and laziness. I will succeed! This book is consecrated to this crusade and I dedicate it to all the young, who have faith in true painting." Modern art techniques, however, are also evident in the piece. George Orwell, who wrote a critique of Dalí's novel Hidden Faces, writes that Dalí admitted that the rocks in The Ecumenical Council are abstract compositions that serve as symbols. Dalí, according to Orwell, is influenced by Mariano Fortuny, a 19th-century Spanish painter.

== Symbolism ==
Religious symbols are pervasive throughout the piece. The title is an homage to the coronation of Angelo Giuseppe Cardinal Roncalli, who became Pope John XXIII in 1958. When John XXIII met with Geoffrey Fisher, the Archbishop of Canterbury, it was the first time the two churches had officially communicated in 426 years. Dalí was enthusiastic about the meeting. He was asked to design a cathedral in Arizona that never came to fruition. However, to discuss the design, in 1959 Dalí requested an audience with the pope. Dalí's vision for the cathedral was that it should be shaped like a pear, which to him represented the resurrection of the Middle Ages, the resurgence of Christian unity and was an appropriate symbol for the council in which the pope and the archbishop would meet.

Dalí's wife, Gala, whose given name was Elena Ivanovna Diakonov, often served as his model and muse. In this piece, as in The Discovery of America by Christopher Columbus, Gala represents St. Helena (some sources state Gala's name was Hélèna), the mother of Constantine I, who became the first Christian emperor of the Roman Empire. St. Helena in Christian theology is the discoverer of the True Cross. Gala holds the same cross that Jesus does, offering it forward to the viewer. Gala's pose amid clouds, water, and rocks appeared in Dalí's earlier work St. Helen of Port Lligat (1956). The cross that Jesus holds in The Ecumenical Council is the lateral central point in the composition (Dalí often included geometric designs and symbolism on canvases in his later works), to represent the central mystery of the trinity. The cliffs of Cap de Creus represent the rock upon which St. Peter built the Christian church, but have Spanish origins. Dalí grew up in Port Lligat, whose patron saint is Helena, often using the surrounding scenery in his paintings, and worked in a studio there where he painted The Ecumenical Council. The Spanish aspects of the painting are Dalí's expressions of patriotism.

Dalí portrays Jesus without solid form in the painting, achieved with rapid strokes to evoke mystic or atomic energy. Scientific theory preoccupied Dalí in the later half of the 20th century, and he represented the structure of atoms and DNA in several works. Scholars suggest that Dalí was influenced by the ideas of Pierre Teilhard de Chardin, a French theologian who proposed that all knowledge—specifically scientific and religious—should be fully integrated and lead to a final "omega point". The interconnectedness of ideas espoused by Chardin is represented by the multiple images that blend into each other in the painting.

== Provenance ==
Dalí's study, The Trinity, is a smaller painting measuring 58.4 by 66 centimetres (23.0 in × 26.0 in). As with The Ecumenical Council, he displays the unity of Father, Son and Holy Spirit: God floating with his face blocked by his hand above Jesus, whose foot is extended and who points upward, with a faceless Holy Spirit. It was exhibited with The Ecumenical Council at the Carstairs Gallery in New York in 1960, whereupon critic Michael Strauss expressed his impression that Dalí was "a very different person" from the previous creator of lascivious works of art. During the exhibition Dalí stated that The Ecumenical Council commemorated "the greatest historical event of our time and which, prudently, I have painted before it has met".

Dalí became friends with American art collectors Albert Reynolds and Eleanor Morse in 1943. Their first purchase was Dalí's war-inspired Daddy Longlegs of the Evening ... Hope! (1940), and after a few acquisitions from his shows, the Morses bought pieces directly from his studio. Gala sold The Ecumenical Council to the Morses for $100,000 ($1,088,301 in 2025), stipulating that it had to be paid in cash, in Spanish pesetas. The Morses originally housed their Dalí collection in a specially built wing of A.R. Morse's engineering firm in Beachwood, Ohio. However, the size of their collection—both in number and dimensions—outgrew the facilities. The City of St. Petersburg, Florida offered to build a museum to house and manage all the pieces. It opened as the Salvador Dalí Museum in 1982, with 95 paintings, including other Dalí masterworks (the museum considers unusually large pieces taking two years to complete as masterpieces) such as The Hallucinogenic Toreador (1970), Galacidalacidesoxyribonucleicacid (1963), Nature Morte Vivante (1956) and The Discovery of America by Christopher Columbus. The Ecumenical Council is currently shown in the Salvador Dalí Museum. The Trinity is housed in the Musei Vaticani in Vatican City.

== See also ==
- List of works by Salvador Dalí

== Bibliography ==
- Ades, Dawn and Taylor, Michael (curators). Dalí, Rizzoli/Philadelphia Museum of Art, 2004. ISBN 0-8478-2673-2
- Canaday, John. Embattled Critic: Views on Modern Art, Farrar, Straus and Cudahy: New York, 1962.
- Dalí, Salvador. 50 Secrets to Magic Craftsmanship, Dover Publications, 1948. ISBN 0-486-27132-3
- Radford, Robert. Dalí, Phaidon Press, 1997. ISBN 0-7148-3411-4
- Romero, Luis. Salvador Dalí, Ediciones Poligrafica, S.A., 2003. ISBN 84-343-1031-7
- Wach, Kenneth. Salvador Dalí: Masterpieces from the Collection of the Salvador Dalí Museum, Harry N. Abrams, 1996. ISBN 0-8109-3235-0
