= Dalí Museum =

Dalí Museum may refer to:

- Dalí Theatre and Museum, in his home town of Figueres, Spain
- Salvador Dalí House Museum, Portlligat, Spain
- Salvador Dalí Museum, St. Petersburg, Florida, United States
- Dalí Universe, London, UK, now part of the Dalí Paris, Paris, France
- Dalí Paris, Paris, France
- Dalí – Die Ausstellung am Potsdamer Platz, Berlin, Germany
- Dalí17 (2016–2022), Monterey, California
