= The Persistence of Memory =

1931 painting by Salvador Dalí

- Artist: Salvador Dalí
- Year: 1931
- Catalogue: 79018
- Medium: Oil on canvas
- Movement: Surrealism
- Dimensions: 24 cm × 33 cm (9.5 in × 13 in)
- Location: Museum of Modern Art, New York City
- Owner: Museum of Modern Art
- Accession: 162.1934

The Persistence of Memory (Catalan: La persistència de la memòria, Spanish: La persistencia de la memoria) is a 1931 painting by artist Salvador Dalí regarded as his most famous, and one of the most recognizable works of Surrealism as a whole. First exhibited at the Julien Levy Gallery in 1932 and sold for $250, The Persistence of Memory was donated to the Museum of Modern Art (MoMA) in New York City two years later in 1934 by an anonymous donor, where it has remained ever since. It is widely recognized and frequently referred to in popular culture, and sometimes referred to by more descriptive titles, such as "The Melting Clocks", "The Soft Watches" or "The Melting Watches".

As a work published in 1931, the painting will enter the public domain in the United States on 1 January 2027.

== Analysis ==
The well-known surrealist piece introduced the image of the soft melting pocket watch. It epitomizes Dalí's theory of "softness" and "hardness", which was central to his thinking at the time. As Dawn Adès wrote, "The soft watches are an unconscious symbol of the relativity of space and time, a Surrealist meditation on the collapse of our notions of a fixed cosmic order". This interpretation suggests that Dalí was incorporating an understanding of the world introduced by Albert Einstein's theory of special relativity. Asked by Ilya Prigogine whether this was the case, Dalí replied that the soft watches were not inspired by the theory of relativity, but by the surrealist perception of a Camembert melting in the sun.

The year prior to painting the Persistence of Memory, Dalí developed his "paranoiac-critical method", deliberately inducing psychotic hallucinations to inspire his art. He remarked, "The difference between a madman and me is that I am not mad."

External videos
- Dalí's The Persistence of Memory
- Salvador Dalí. The Persistence of Memory. 1931

In the center of the painting, beneath the rightmost clock, is a distorted human face in profile. The monstrous, fleshy creature (with much texture near its face, and much contrast and tone in the picture) draped across the painting's center is at once alien and familiar. It is an approximation of Dalí's own face, elevating the piece from pure abstraction into something of a self-portrait. Similar creatures appear frequently in Dalí's work, including a being who appears in his earlier painting The Great Masturbator. The creature seems to have been originally modeled after a figure from the "Paradise" section of Hieronymus Bosch's The Garden of Earthly Delights, which Dalí had studied. It can be read as a "fading" creature, one that often appears in dreams where the dreamer cannot pinpoint the creature's exact form and composition. The creature has one closed eye with several eyelashes, suggesting that it is also in a dream or resting state. The iconography may refer to a dream that Dalí himself had experienced, and the clocks may symbolize the passing of time as one experiences in sleep, or the persistence of time in the eyes of the dreamer.

The orange watch at the bottom left of the painting is covered in ants, and does not melt. Its firmness contrasts with the dreamlike mutability of the others, offering a grounded counterpoint in an otherwise warped landscape. The usage of ants to symbolize decay is a recurring theme throughout Dalí's artwork. In the 1929 essay titled "The Liberation of fingers" (French: "La Libération des doigts"), published in the magazine L'amic de les arts, Dalí described seeing a lizard decomposed and eaten by ants when he was three or four years old. Another incident that profoundly affected him as a child is recounted in his book, The Secret of Life. His cousin gave him a wounded bat, which he adored and left overnight in a little pail in the wash-house. "Next morning a frightful spectacle awaited me. When I reached the back of the wash-house I found the glass had overturned, and the bat, though still half alive, [was] bristling with frenzied ants". A fly perched atop the leftmost open-facing watch appears to be casting a human shadow as the sun hits it.

The craggy rocks to the right represent the tip of Cap de Creus peninsula in north-eastern Catalonia. Many of Dalí's paintings were inspired by the landscapes of his life in Catalonia. The strange and foreboding shadow in the foreground of this painting is a reference to Puig Pení, a mountain in the northeast corner of Catalonia. The elongated and distorted tree on the left is an iconic character in Dalí's works.

== Versions ==
The Disintegration of the Persistence of Memory (1954)

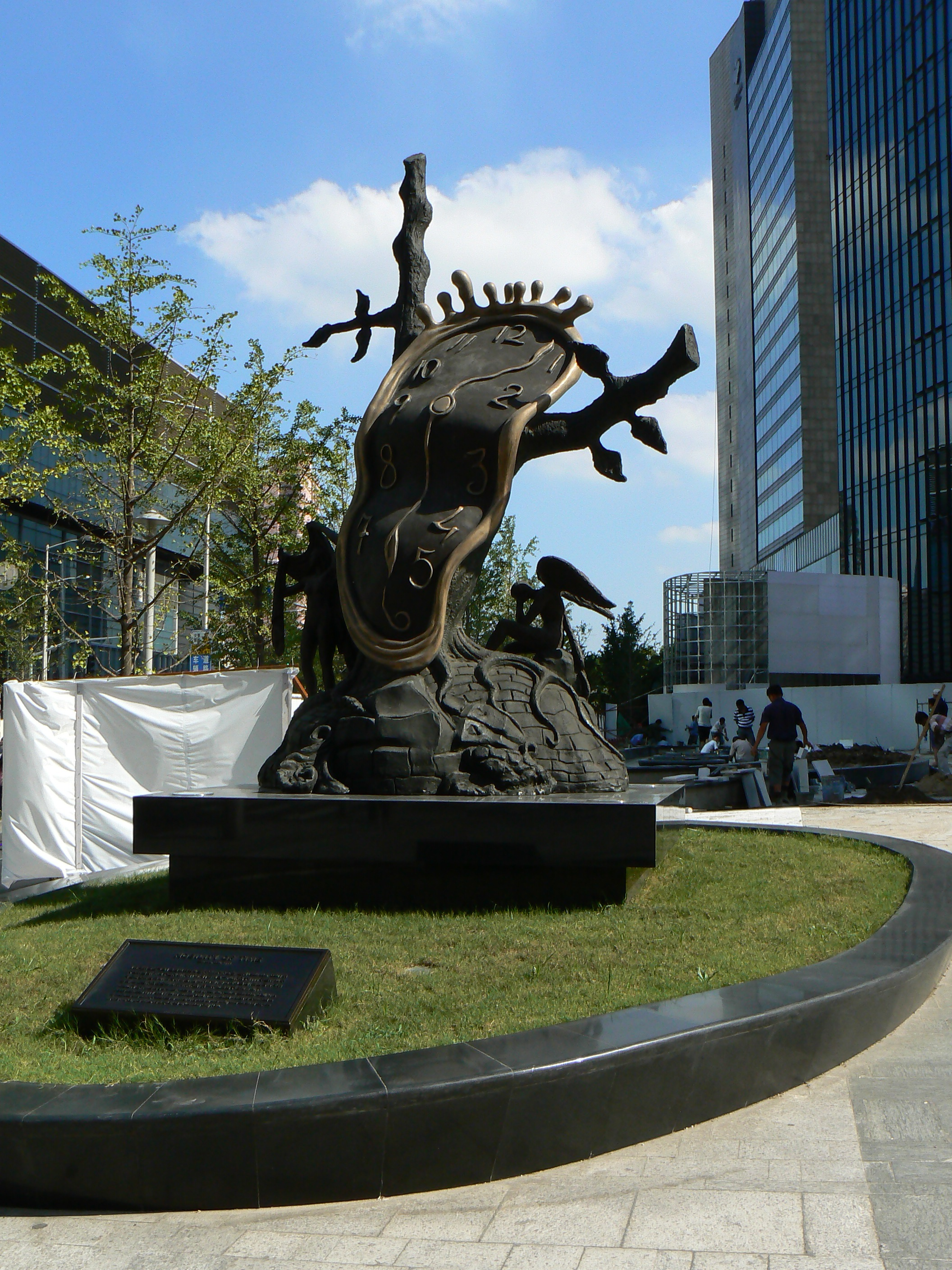
The Shanghai copy of the sculpture Nobility of Time

Dalí returned to the theme of this painting with the variation The Disintegration of the Persistence of Memory (Spanish: La Desintegración de la Persistencia de la Memoria; 1954), showing his earlier famous work systematically fragmenting into smaller component elements, and a series of rectangular blocks which reveal further imagery through the gaps between them. Added is an ominous suggestion of bullets to the original. This work is now in the Salvador Dalí Museum in St. Petersburg, Florida, while the original Persistence of Memory remains at the Museum of Modern Art in New York City. Dalí also produced various lithographs and sculptures on the theme of soft watches late in his career. Some of these sculptures are the Persistence of Memory, Nobility of Time, Profile of Time, and Three Dancing Watches.

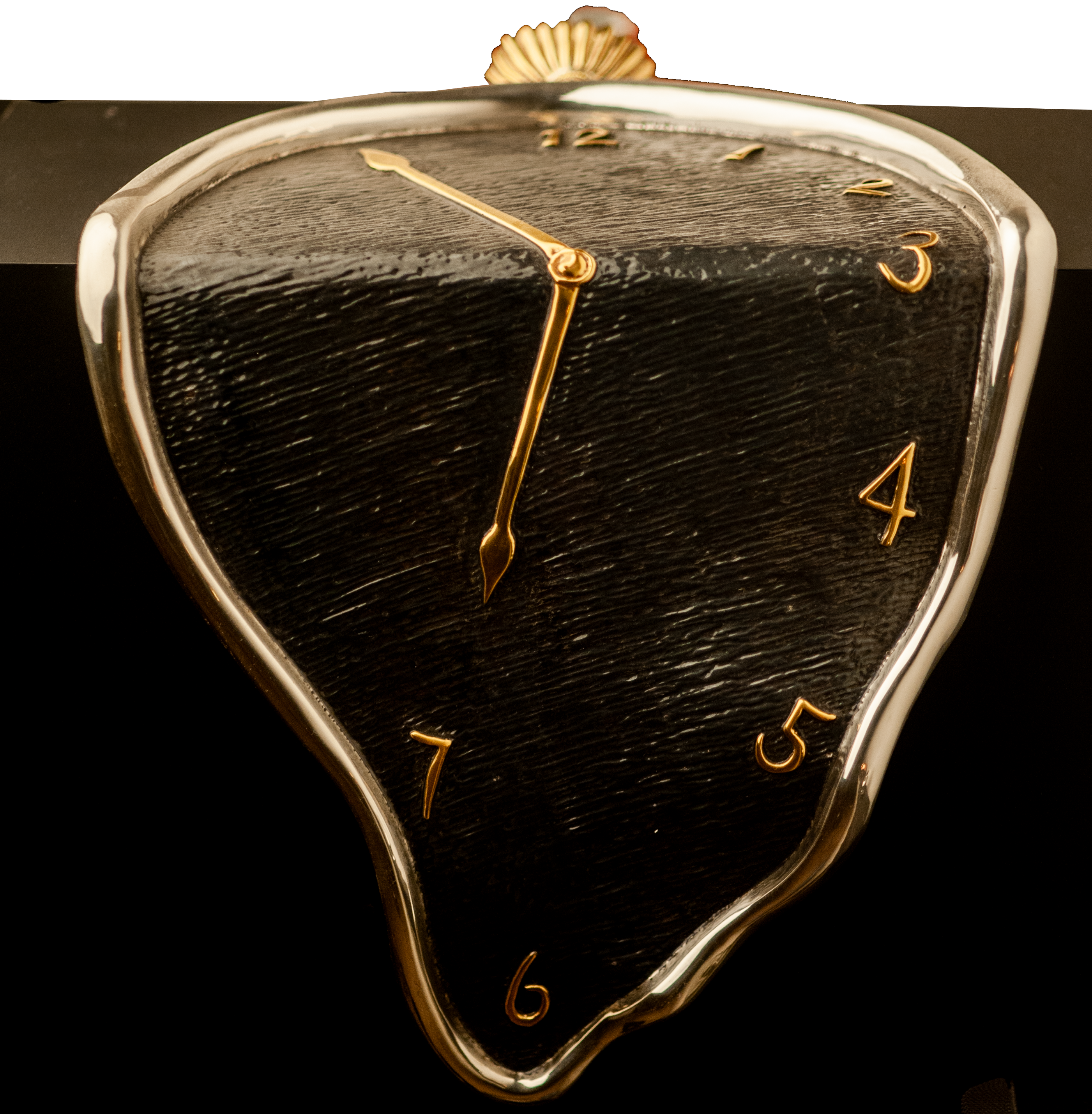
The Gala-Salvador Foundation representation of the Persistence of Memory by D'Argenta

== See also ==
- List of works by Salvador Dalí
- Entropy (arrow of time)
- Apparatus and Hand
- The Disintegration of the Persistence of Memory
