= Living Still Life =

1956 painting by Salvador Dalí

- Artist: Salvador Dalí
- Year: 1956
- Medium: Oil on canvas
- Dimensions: 125 cm × 160 cm (49.64 in × 63.76 in)
- Location: Salvador Dalí Museum; St. Petersburg, Florida

Living Still Life (French: Nature Morte Vivante) is a 1956 painting by the artist Salvador Dalí. Dalí painted this piece during a period that he called "Nuclear Mysticism". Nuclear Mysticism is composed of different theories that try to show the relationships between quantum physics and the conscious mind. The different theories are composed of elements that range from "Catalan philosophers” to "classicism, pop art, and nuclear physics". The painting, done in 1956, currently resides at the Salvador Dalí Museum in St. Petersburg, Florida.

The name Nature Morte Vivante translates in English to "living still life". It comes from the French nature morte which literally translates to "dead nature". By appending "vivante", which implies "fast moving action and a certain lively quality", Dalí was essentially naming this piece "dead nature in movement". This plays into his theme of Nuclear Mysticism which combined elements of art, physics, and science. The theory, as well as the term, "Nuclear Mysticism" was coined by Dalí himself. In the late 1940s and early 1950s Dalí started to "return to his Catholic roots following World War II". Nuclear mysticism is composed of different theories by Dalí that combine science, physics, maths, and art. Post WWII, Dalí became fascinated by the atom. Dalí stated that after the U.S. dropped the first atomic bomb in Japan that it "shook me [Dalí] seismically" and that the atom was his "favorite food for thought".

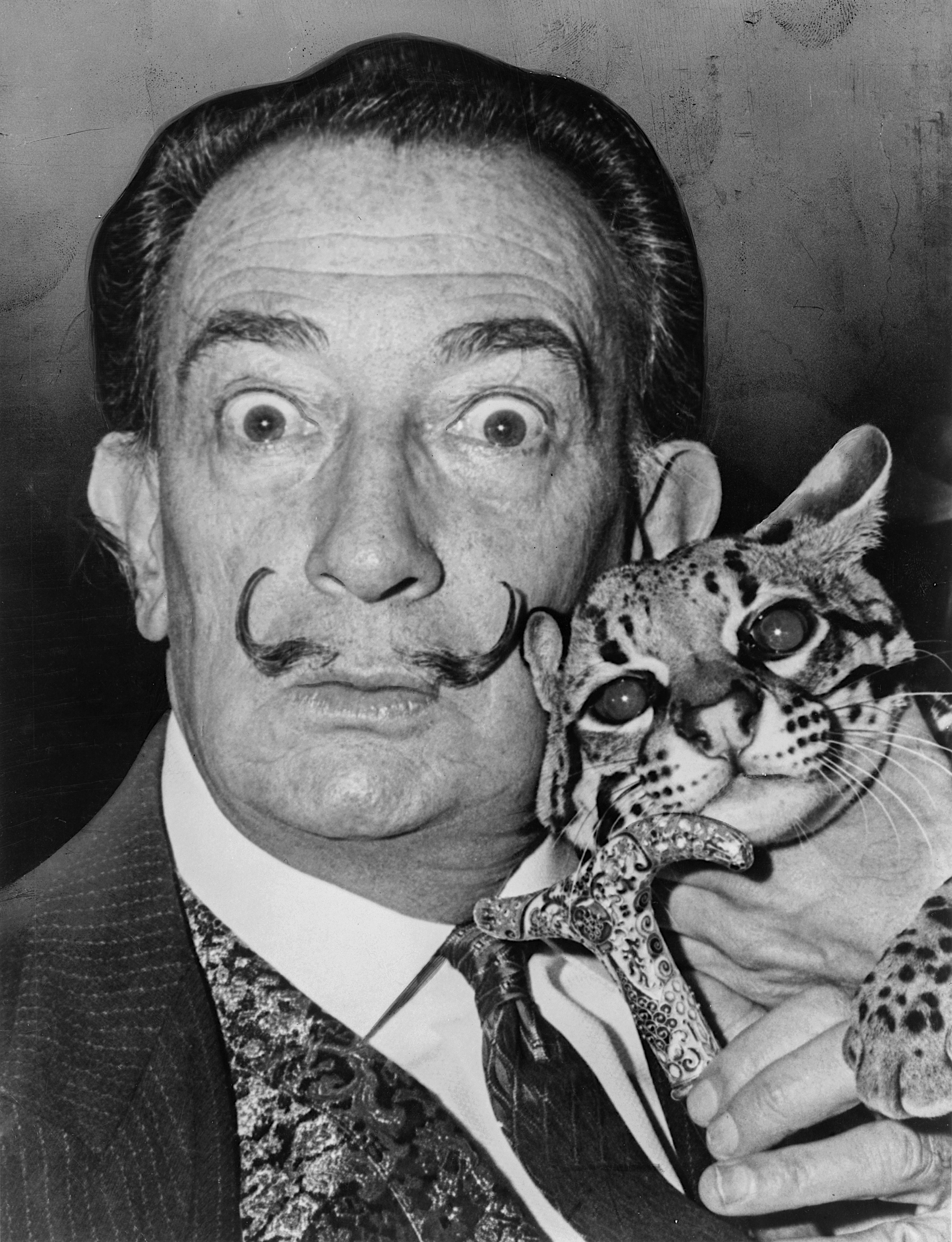
Salvador Dalí, 1965

Dalí saw the beauty of the atom and was interested in how the atom makes up everything. In this painting, Dalí wanted to show the motion that all objects have, that although an object is still, it is always full of millions of atoms that are constantly in motion. He portrays this thought throughout his painting. Every object in the painting is moving in some direction, one that an object of that type normally does not do. Dalí was also obsessed with the spiral, which he thought to be "the most important feature in nature", and used it as "a symbol of cosmic order". Dalí portrayed this idea by adding a spiral in the top right corner of his painting. Not only does Dalí portray his objects flying around the scene, he shows them twisted in usual ways. For example, the silver bowl is not only shown mid-air, but also twisted in an unnatural way for silver to bend. Dalí also infused religious elements of Nuclear Mysticism into this painting. On the table with the white tablecloth, the objects placed closest to the table and that appear to be the least in motion are a glass of wine, two grapes, a pear, a glass bottle with water pouring out, and what appears to be a fig leaf. The fig leaf has long been a religious symbol associated with Christianity. In the Bible, Adam and Eve use fig leaves to cover themselves after their deception in the Garden of Eden. The placement of the fig leaf in Dalí's painting could allude to his reemergence back into Catholicism.

Dalí took inspiration from Dutch painter Floris van Schooten and his painting Table with Food for his own painting Nature Morte Vivante. Van Schooten's painting, which was a very common type of painting for its time, was a very typical still life that depicted food and drinks on a table with a crisp white tablecloth. Dalí wanted to give his own take on it, and give it his surrealist signature by showing all of the objects in motion. He also added the tablecloth, which looks very similar to tablecloths that Schooten had used throughout his own paintings. Even though most of the objects Dalí portrays are ordinary things, he puts a spin, literally and figuratively, on the motion and placement of the objects. The disarray of the objects alludes to his interest in nuclear mysticism. He believed that "all matter was not at all like it seemed, but instead had attributes that even he was only able to guess". He wanted to enforce that "that all objects are made of atomic particles in constant motion", which he portrays through the scattered items. He painted the still life objects to move in a life of his own, without the complacency of a typical still life.

== See also ==
- List of works by Salvador Dalí

== Related paintings ==
- Dalí, Salvador. Disintegration of the Persistence of Memory. 1952–54. Oil on canvas. 10 in. x 13 in. The Salvador Dalí Museum, St. Petersburg, Florida.
- Schooten, Floris van. A Dutch Breakfast, 1612–1655. Oil on panel. 24.8 in. x 32.7. The Louvre, Paris.
