= Galacidalacidesoxyribonucleicacid =

1963 painting by Salvador Dalí

Galacidalacidesoxiribunucleicacid
- Artist: Salvador Dalí
- Year: 1963
- Medium: Oil on canvas
- Dimensions: 305 cm × 345 cm (120 in × 136 in)
- Location: Salvador Dalí Museum; St. Petersburg, Florida

Galacidalacidesoxiribunucleicacid (also known as Homage to Crick and Watson (Discoverers of DNA)) is a 1963 painting by Salvador Dalí. The painting's title is a portmanteau of the name of Dalí's wife, Gala Dalí, and deoxyribonucleic acid (DNA). It is a tribute to Francis Crick and James D. Watson, who are credited with determining the double helical structure of DNA in 1953.

The painting is in the collection of the Salvador Dalí Museum in St. Petersburg, Florida.

== History ==
The painting was commissioned by the New England National Bank of Boston. It was exhibited at Knoedler in 1963 from November 26 to December 26. In the exhibition catalogue, Dalí declared that:

At a time when the titles of pictures are rather short (i.e. "Picture No. 1" or "White on White") I call my Hommage to Crick and Watson: GALACIDALACIDESOXIRIBUNUCLEICACID. It is my longest title in one word. But the theme is even longer: long as the genetical persistence of human memory. As announced by the prophet Isaiah—the Saviour contained in God's head from which one sees for the first time in the iconographic history his arms repeating the molecular structures of Crick and Watson and lifting Christ's dead body so as to resuscitate him in heaven.

== Composition ==
Gala Dalí is depicted in the foreground of the painting, with her back to the viewer.

== Analysis ==
In a note describing the work, Dalí mused that the double helix is "the only structure linking man to God." This is one of 13 large paintings Dalí produced. On the right-hand side there are riflemen arranged to form "cubes of death". Within each "cube of death" their rifles aim at each other's head, thus if one of them shoots it will trigger the reaction of the other three, and they will all shoot killing each other. According to Dalí, these cubes also represent the cubic structure of one of the most familiar substances, table salt or sodium chloride. However, the crystal structure of NaCl is cubic all-face centered rather than cubic primitive, thus there is a scientific inconsistency.

"The prophet Isaiah appears at the top left holding a scroll inscribed with the title of the painting—Galacidalacidesoxiribunucleicacid. It combines a string of words that decodes the meaning of the work. The first word in the string is Gala, Dalí‘s wife and muse. The word ―"cid" refers to a Spanish folklore hero, and Allah is the Arabic word for God. The last word in the string is Dalí's spelling of the full scientific name for DNA—desoxiribunucleicacid."[4]

== See also ==
- List of works by Salvador Dalí

== Bibliography ==
- Keller, Georges (1963). Georges Keller presents DALI: November 26 to December 26, 1963. New York: M. Knoedler & Co.
