= The Disintegration of the Persistence of Memory =

Painting by Salvador Dalí

- Artist: Salvador Dalí
- Year: 1952–1954
- Medium: Oil on canvas
- Dimensions: 25.4 cm × 33 cm (10 in × 13 in)
- Location: Salvador Dalí Museum; St. Petersburg, Florida

La Desintegración de la Persistencia de la Memoria or The Disintegration of the Persistence of Memory is an oil on canvas painting by the Spanish surrealist Salvador Dalí. It is a 1954 re-creation of the artist's famous 1931 work The Persistence of Memory, and measures a diminutive 25.4 × 33 cm. It was originally known as The Chromosome of a Highly coloured Fish's Eye Starting the Harmonious Disintegration of the Persistence of Memory, and first exhibited at the Carstairs Gallery in New York in 1954.

== Description ==
In this version, the landscape from the original work has been flooded with water. Disintegration depicts what is occurring both above and below the water's surface. The landscape of Cadaqués is now hovering above the water. The plane and block from the original is now divided into brick-like shapes that float in relation to each other, with nothing binding them. These represent the breakdown of matter into atoms, a revelation in the age of quantum mechanics. Behind the bricks, the horns receding into the distance symbolise atomic missiles, highlighting that despite cosmic order, humanity could bring about its own destruction. The dead olive tree from which the soft watch hangs has also begun to break apart. The hands of the watches float above their dials, with several conical objects floating in parallel formations encircling the watches. A fourth melting watch has been added. The distorted human visage from the original painting is beginning to morph into another of the strange fish floating above it. To Dalí, however, the fish was a symbol of life.

== Background ==
Dalí had been greatly interested in nuclear physics since the first atomic bomb explosions of July 1945, and described the atom as his "favourite food for thought". Recognising that matter was made up of atoms which did not touch each other, he sought to replicate this in his art at the time, with items suspended and not interacting with each other, such as in The Madonna of Port Lligat. To Dalí, this image was symbolic of the new physics—the quantum world which exists as both particles and waves. The imagery of the original Persistence of Memory can be read as a representation of Einstein's theory of relativity (although Dalí himself denied the connection to the theory), symbolizing the relativity of time and space. In this new work, quantum mechanics is symbolized by "digitizing" the old image.

Dalí symbolised and marked his loss of interest in surrealism with The Disintegration of the Persistence of Memory as his interest in nuclear physics and religion led him elsewhere.

The painting is currently owned by the Salvador Dalí Museum in St. Petersburg, Florida. It was transported to and exhibited at the National Gallery of Victoria in Melbourne in 2009, along with many other Dalí paintings in the Liquid Desire exhibition.

== See also ==
- List of works by Salvador Dalí
