= Puig Pení =

Spanish mountain

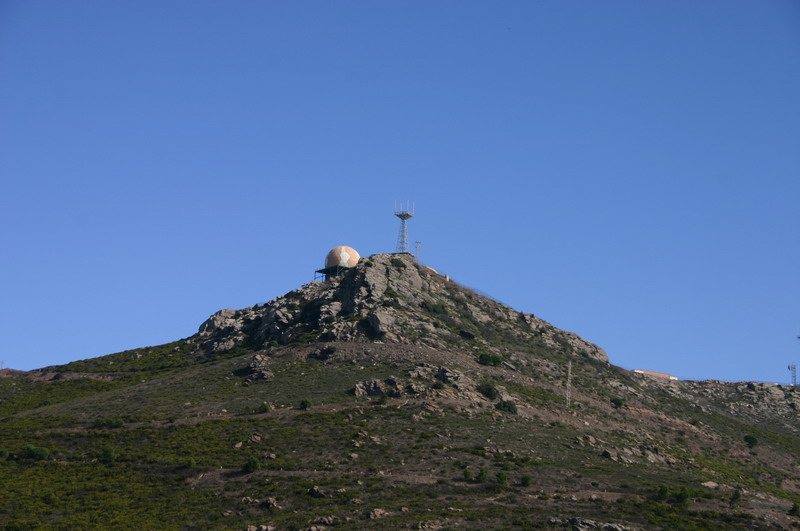
Summit of Puig Pení

Puig Pení is a mountain in Catalonia, Spain. It is thought to be depicted in Salvador Dalí's painting The Persistence of Memory.
