= Dalí Universe =

Former art museum

Coordinates: 48°53′11.5″N 2°20′23″E

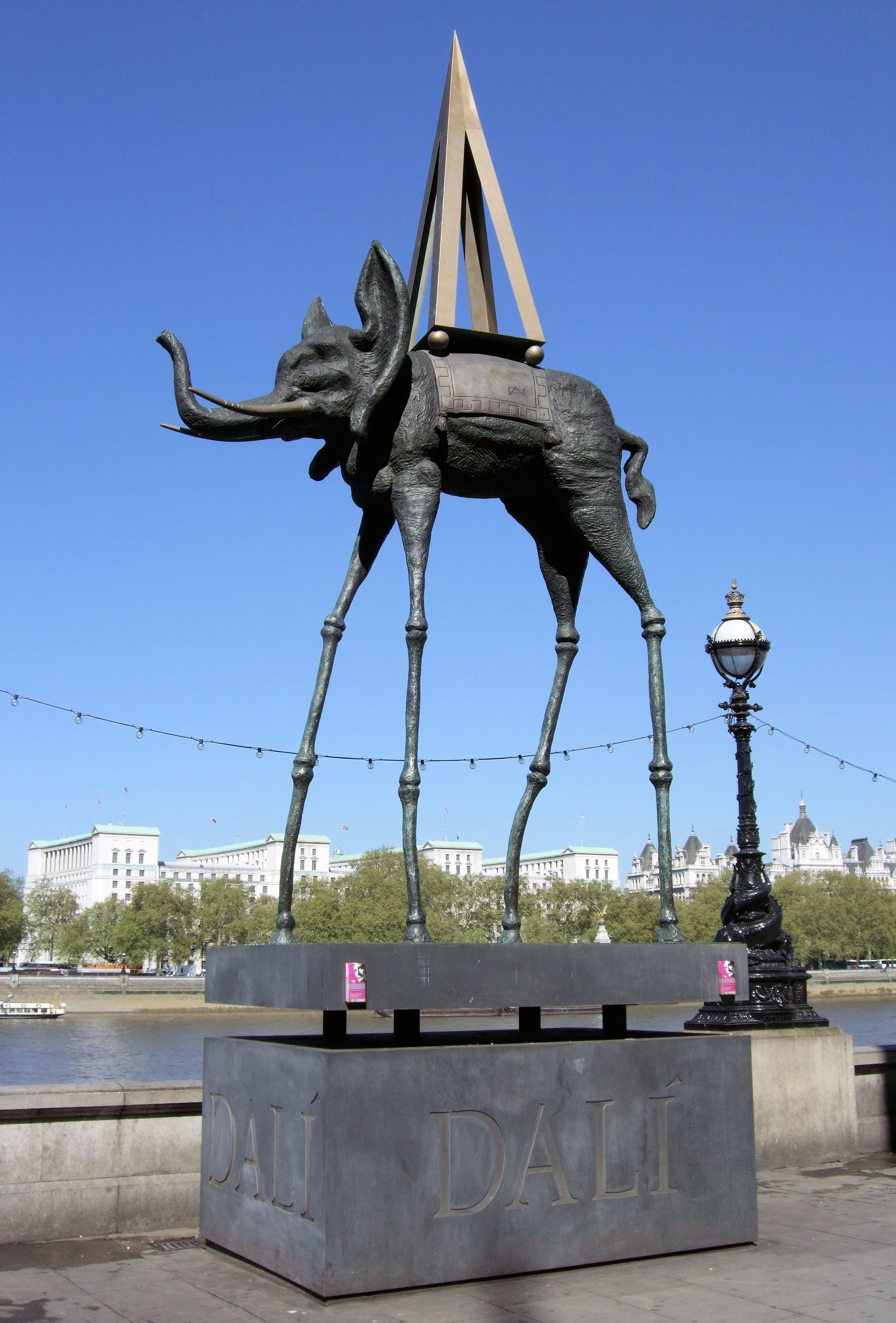
Space Elephant (1980) on display in London

The Dalí Universe is a collection of Salvador Dalí artworks consisting mainly of sculptures, curated by Beniamino Levi, Italian gallerist and collector. Opened in 2000 in London, in 2010 the Dalí Universe permanently relocated to the Espace Dalí in Paris, France. Part of the collection, however, is sometimes exhibited at international locations. The exhibition includes mainly bronze sculptures, drawings, lithographs and glass and gold sculptures. The last international exhibitions were held in Beijing, China, in 2018, and in Liège, Belgium, in 2016. Previous locations have also included Singapore, Taipei, Shanghai, New York City, Florence and Venice.

== History ==
Dalí Universe opened in 2000 in a 3,000 square metre (32,000 square feet) suite of galleries at County Hall in London, England. Over 500 works were on display, including sculptures dating from 1935 to 1984, drawings, lithographs, gold and glass objects and a Dalí-inspired furniture collection. It did not feature major paintings except for a huge oil on canvas from the Alfred Hitchcock film Spellbound.

Initially a semi-permanent exhibition of art works on the South Bank, London, the exhibition closed in January 2010. Since then, the collection has been kept in Paris, France, at the Espace Dalí. At times (most recently in 2018), part of the collection is exhibited at international locations.

== Gallery ==
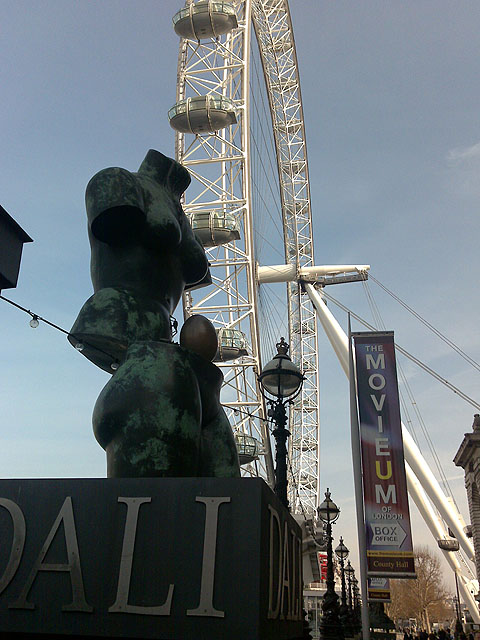
Space Venus (1977–1984)

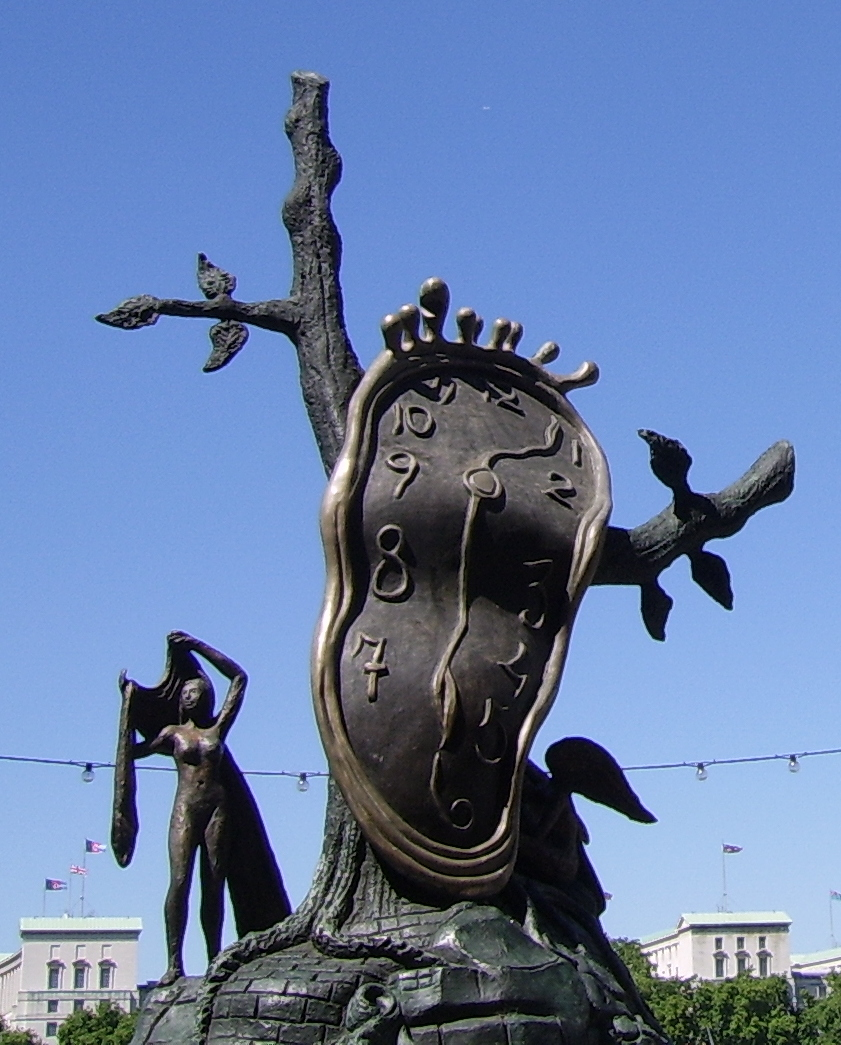
Nobility of Time (1977–1984)

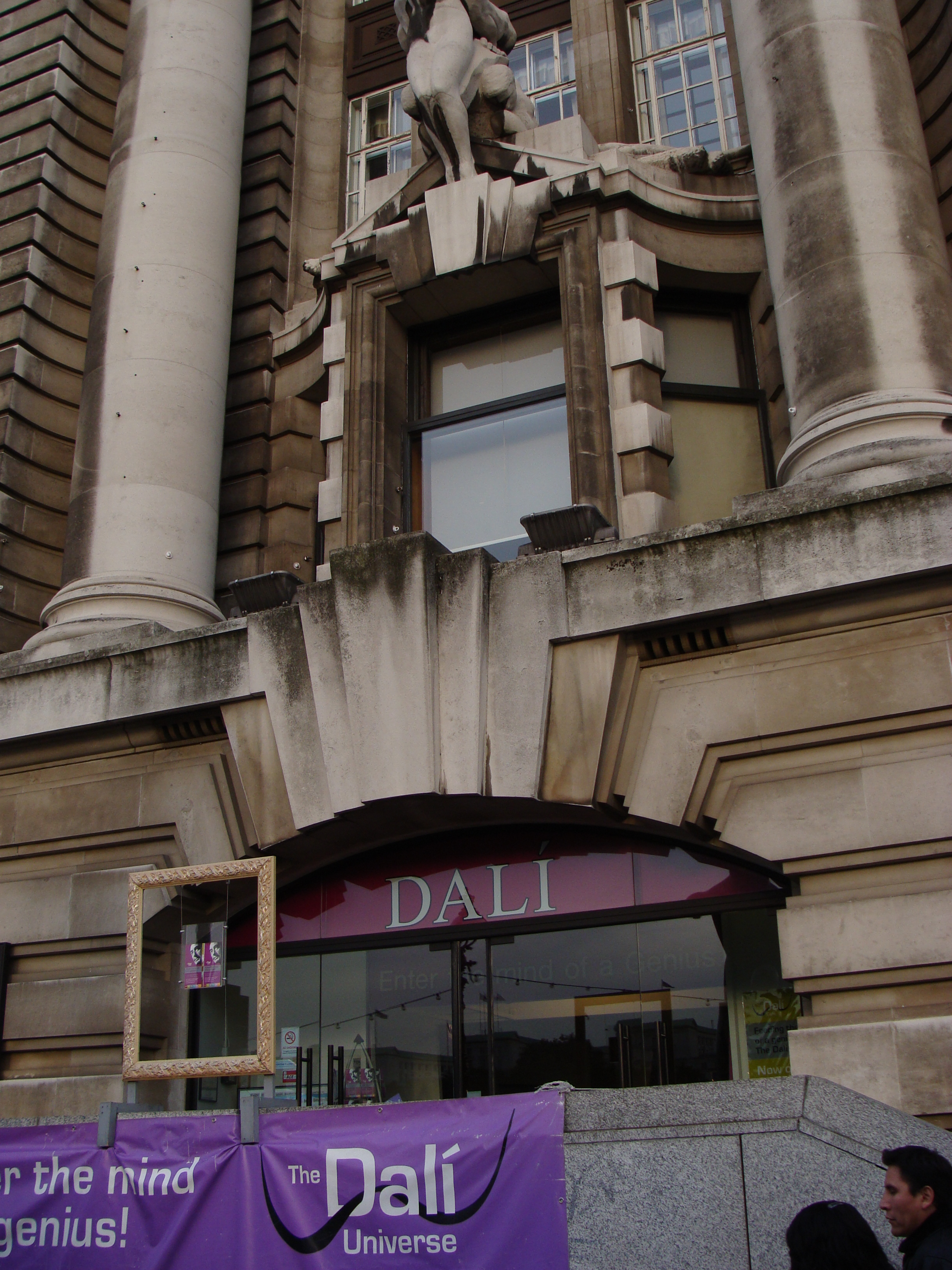
The former entrance to Dalí Universe in County hall (London)

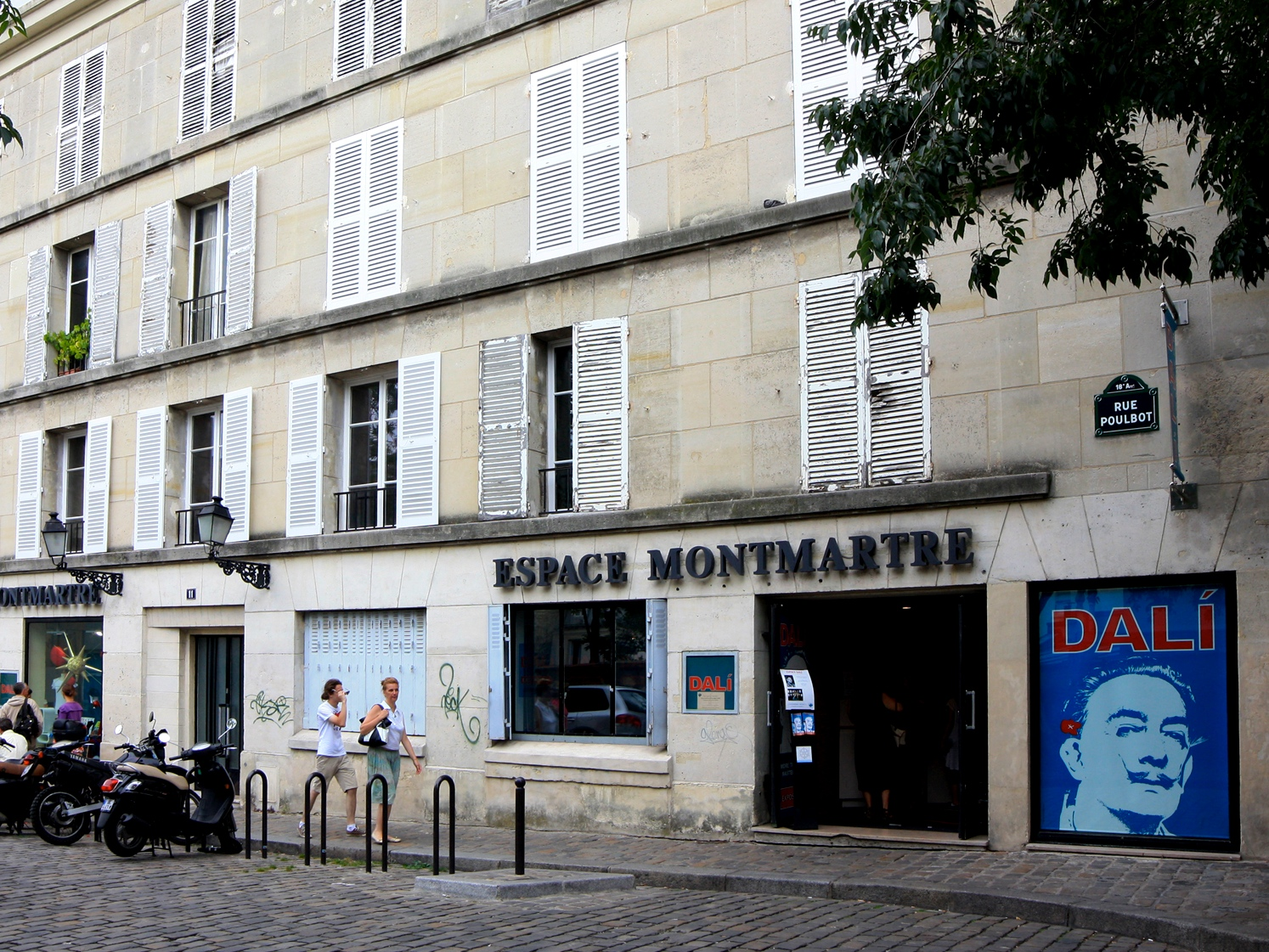
The current entrance to Espace Dalí (Paris)

== See also ==
- Dalí Paris (formerly known as Espace Dalí)
