= The Hallucinogenic Toreador =

1969–1970 painting by Salvador Dalí

- Artist: Salvador Dalí
- Year: 1969–1970
- Medium: Oil on canvas
- Dimensions: 398.8 cm × 299.7 cm (157 in × 118 in)
- Location: Salvador Dalí Museum, St. Petersburg

The Hallucinogenic Toreador (Spanish: El Torero Alucinógeno) is a 1969–1970 multi-leveled oil painting by Salvador Dalí which employs the canons of his particular interpretation of surrealist thought. It is held at the Salvador Dalí Museum in St. Petersburg, Florida. In The Hallucinogenic Toreador Dalí transmits his wife's dislike for bullfighting by combining symbolism, optical illusions, and estranging yet familiar motifs. Dalí used his paranoiac-critical method to create his own visual language within the painting, and combined versatile images as an instructive example of his artistic ability and vision.

== Description ==
The entire scene is contained within a bullfighting ring, submerged under a barrage of red and yellow tones, alluding tentatively to the colors of the Spanish flag. In the upper left section we observe a representational portrait of Dalí's wife, Gala, to whom the artist has dedicated this piece. Her serious, rigid expression could be interpreted as a pictorial representation of her deep-seated dislike for bullfighting. In the bottom left section there is a pattern of multicolored circles. This rectangular-shaped burst of colors immediately grasps the viewer's attention and steers it down towards the visibly emerging shape of a dying bull's head (probably Islero), dripping blood and saliva from its mouth.

This pool of blood transforms itself into a sheltered bay where a human figure on a yellow raft comes into sight. The lower section of the bay takes on the shape of a Dalmatian. The slain bull slowly rises to become the landscapes of Cap de Creus, around Dalí's living place. It was said that concern for an increase in tourism led Dalí to embrace its features in the painting. The mountain is mimicked on the right; however, this time, the mountain bears greater resemblance to the precipitous mountains around the town of Roses, near Dalí's studio.

An old anecdote lies behind the painter's desire to represent the sculpted figure of Venus de Milo, seen 28 times in the painting. Dalí decided to incorporate these particular silhouettes in his paintings after a visit to New York, where he purchased a box of pencils with a reproduction of the goddess on the cover. Dalí uses negative spaces to produce an image, alternate and complementary to the Venus de Milo. This complementary image encourages the eye to contemplate the painting in such a way as to introduce the quasi-hypnotic array of forms that inhabit the canvas. Examined from a distance, the body of the second Venus reveals the face and torso of the toreador (bullfighter, likely Manolete). Her breasts as his nose, while her face transforms into his eye. Their long skirts make up his white shirt and red scarf of the Toreador. The green layer makes up his necktie. His eye is found within the face of the second Venus. The soft white area unveils a tear slipping from his eye.

The gadflies of Saint Narcissus of Gerona march over the arena in seemingly straight and parallel lines, forming the cap, hairnet and cape of the toreador. Situated on the lower right hand corner, the whole spectacle is being watched by an infant boy dressed in a sailor's suit who is said to represent Dalí as a youth.

When the painting was exhibited in a New York City gallery in the late 1960s as a work in progress, it was accompanied by an illustration of the design, matting out the areas not relevant to the Toreador so that he was easier to see. It was labeled explicitly, "How to see the toreador." The piece is now housed in the Dali Museum in St. Petersburg, Florida and can be seen with hundreds of Dali's other paintings and sculptures.

== See also ==
- List of works by Salvador Dalí
