= Dalí Paris =

Art museum in France

Coordinates: 48°53′11.5″N 2°20′23″E

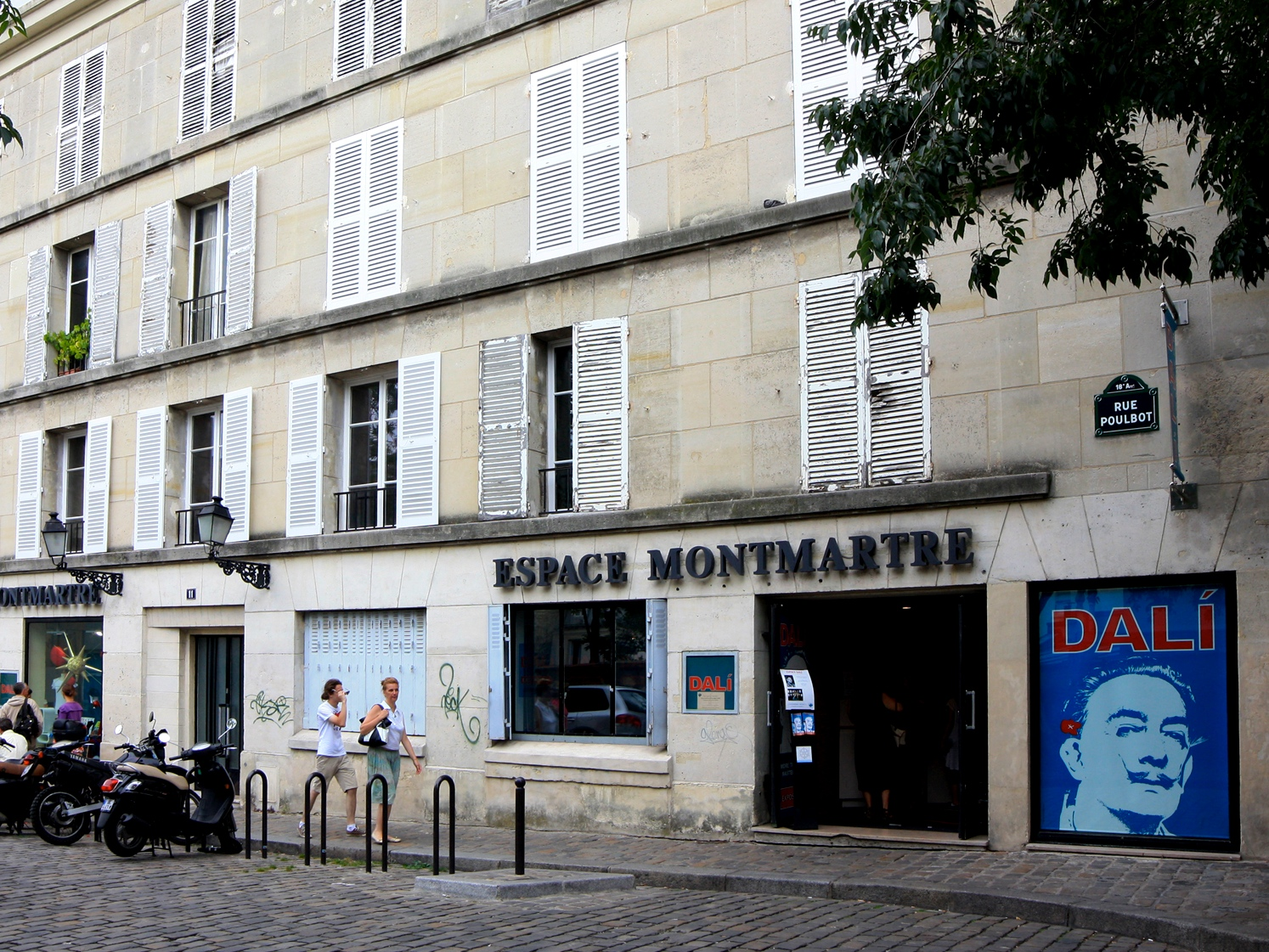
Espace Dalí

The Dalí Paris (formerly Espace Dalí) is a museum exhibition in France devoted to Salvador Dalí consisting mainly of sculptures and engravings. The museum, near the Place du Tertre in the Montmartre district of Paris, was inaugurated in 1991, and it has around 300 original artworks. The collection features mainly three-dimensional sculptures of Dalí's best known surrealistic paintings.

The collection exhibited is part of the Dalí Universe collection, curated by Beniamino Levi, Italian gallerist and collector. Sculptures such as Space Elephant and Alice in Wonderland are presented, and the visitor can also see other aspects such as Moses and monotheism, Memories of Surrealism, Don Quixote, etc. Music plays in the background, and there are creative workshops for children to give them the opportunity to become familiar with Dalí's art. Adjacent to the museum are two art galleries: the Galerie Dalí which presents a selection of some of the artist's works (sculptures, engravings and lithographs), and the Galerie Montmartre, which shows the works of several contemporary artists. The museum is open everyday from 10:00 a.m. to 6:00 p.m.

== Temporary exhibitions ==
Espace Dalí presents each year a new temporary exhibition :

- 2008 : Dalí et la Mode,
- 2008/2009 : Dalí - Hologrammes et jeux d'optique
- 2009 : Dalí à l'Œuvre] Espace Dalí shows the heart of the creation in the artist stating, from April 10 to June 24, Dalí at work. Over 100 photographs taken in 1950 by a friend and specialist Master Robert Descharnes, reveal the artist in full creativity. Carefully selected by Nicolas Descharnes, expert of the work, these photographs show the artist, visionary, struggling with his most unusual tools often. The eye of Robert Descharnes seized the moment to play the creation of the work.
- 2009/2010 : Dalí d'Or et Bijoux de Gala The Espace Dalí turns into a jewel box and houses the collection of jewels and gold items designed by Salvador Dalí in 1960's. Sumptuous pieces illuminate the largest exhibition of works by the Catalan master in France. These jewelry and coins praise the career of the world-renowned artist.
- 2012 : Signé Dalí, la collection Sabater Espace Dalí presents for the first time in France the collection of works offered and autographed by Salvador Dalí to his friend and Secretary Enrique Sabater. From February 10 to May 10, 2012, the public admired a hundred dedications composed of oils, watercolors, sketches, drawings, models of furniture, photographs that are evidence of the friendship between the Catalan genius and the man who was his secretary for more than twelve years.
- 2014 : Dalí fait le mur, 22 artistes street art s'invitent chez Dalí Polymorphic, explosive, rebel, bewildering, funny, unusual, non-conformist, popular: description of the Dalínian method or that of the Street Art? Beyond the creative process, what brings these creators close to one another is their unique way of revealing the world: provocative, iconoclastic and wild. Just like Dalí, street artists are limitless when it comes to their sources of inspiration and convictions, the materiel and the mediums they use. About twenty urban artists have met the challenge. In dialogue with the works exhibited at Espace Dalí, each of them created an artwork which dares to confront the surrealist universe with the vocabulary and the codes of urban art: painting, stencil, design, light painting, sound and installation.
- 2015 : Daum, Variations d'Artistes - Who could bring together in the same exhibition the following artists: Arman, Ben, César, Paella Chimicos, Louis Derbré, Etienne, Carlos Mata, Hilton McConnico, Jérôme Mesnager, Alain Séchas, Richard Texier… and Salvador Dalí? Only Daum can, the famous master glassmaker from Lorraine, partner with artists for over 130 years. In 1968, when the Daum approached the extravagant Salvador Dalí to ask him to work with crystal, neither one would have imagined that the combination of craftsmanship and art would live on, adding new horizons for the French manufacture that possesses unique French expertise.

== See also ==
- Dalí Theatre and Museum — the largest collection of Dalí's artworks, in Figueres, Spain
- Salvador Dalí Museum — home to many of Dalí's large masterwork paintings, in St Petersburg, Florida
- Dalí – Die Ausstellung am Potsdamer Platz — museum with permanent exhibition of more than 450 artworks of Salvador Dalí in Central Berlin, Germany.
- Salvador Dalí House Museum, in Portlligat, Spain
- List of museums in Paris
- List of single-artist museums
