= The Discovery of America by Christopher Columbus =

1959 painting by Salvador Dalí

The Discovery of America By Christopher Columbus
- Artist: Salvador Dalí
- Year: 1959
- Medium: oil on canvas
- Dimensions: 410 cm × 284 cm (161.4 in × 111.8 in)
- Location: Salvador Dalí Museum, St. Petersburg, Florida

The Discovery of America by Christopher Columbus is a painting by the Spanish artist Salvador Dalí, begun in 1958 and finished in 1959. It is over 14 feet tall and over 9 feet wide (410 × 284 cm; 161.4 × 111.8 in), one in a series of large paintings Dalí did during this era.

== Description ==
This work is an ambitious homage to Dalí's Spain. It combines Spanish history, religion, art, and myth into a unified whole. It was commissioned for Huntington Hartford for the opening of his Museum Gallery of Modern Art in New York's 2 Columbus Circle. At this time, some Catalan historians were claiming that Columbus was actually from Catalonia, not Italy, making the discovery all the more relevant for Dalí, who was also from this region of Spain.

The eponymous painting deals with Christopher Columbus's first landing in the New World. It depicts the event metaphorically rather than aiming for historical accuracy. Columbus is depicted not as a middle-aged mariner, but as an adolescent boy in a classical robe to symbolize America as a young continent with its best years ahead of it.

Dalí, in a period of intense interest in Roman Catholic mysticism at the time, symbolically portrayed Columbus bringing Christianity and the true church to a new world as a great and holy accomplishment.

Gala Dalí, the painter's wife, whom he often depicted as the Virgin Mary, poses for the role of The Blessed Virgin (or according to some commentators Saint Helena) on the banner in the right hand of Columbus. She appears as a Saint, suggesting that she is Dalí's muse and that she is responsible for his own, "Discovery of America".

Dalí painted himself in the background as a kneeling monk holding a crucifix. Dalí's belief that Columbus was Catalan is represented by the incorporation of the old Catalan flag.

The painting contains numerous references to the works of Diego Velázquez (specifically The Surrender of Breda), a Spanish painter who had died 300 years earlier, and who influenced both Dalí's painting and his moustache. Dalí borrows the spears from that painting and places them on the right hand side of his work. Within these spears, Dalí has painted the image of a crucified Christ, which was based on a drawing by the Spanish mystic, St. John.

In the bottom center of the painting, on the beach a few steps in front of Columbus, is the bumpy and pockmarked brown sphere of a sea urchin with a curious halo-like ring around it.

== Current status ==
The painting now hangs in the Salvador Dalí Museum in St. Petersburg, Florida which provides a permanent home for the collection of A. Reynolds Morse & Eleanor R. Morse.

== See also ==
- List of works by Salvador Dalí
- A Thousand and One... Americas (television series)
