= Salvador Dalí Museum =

Monographic museum in the United States

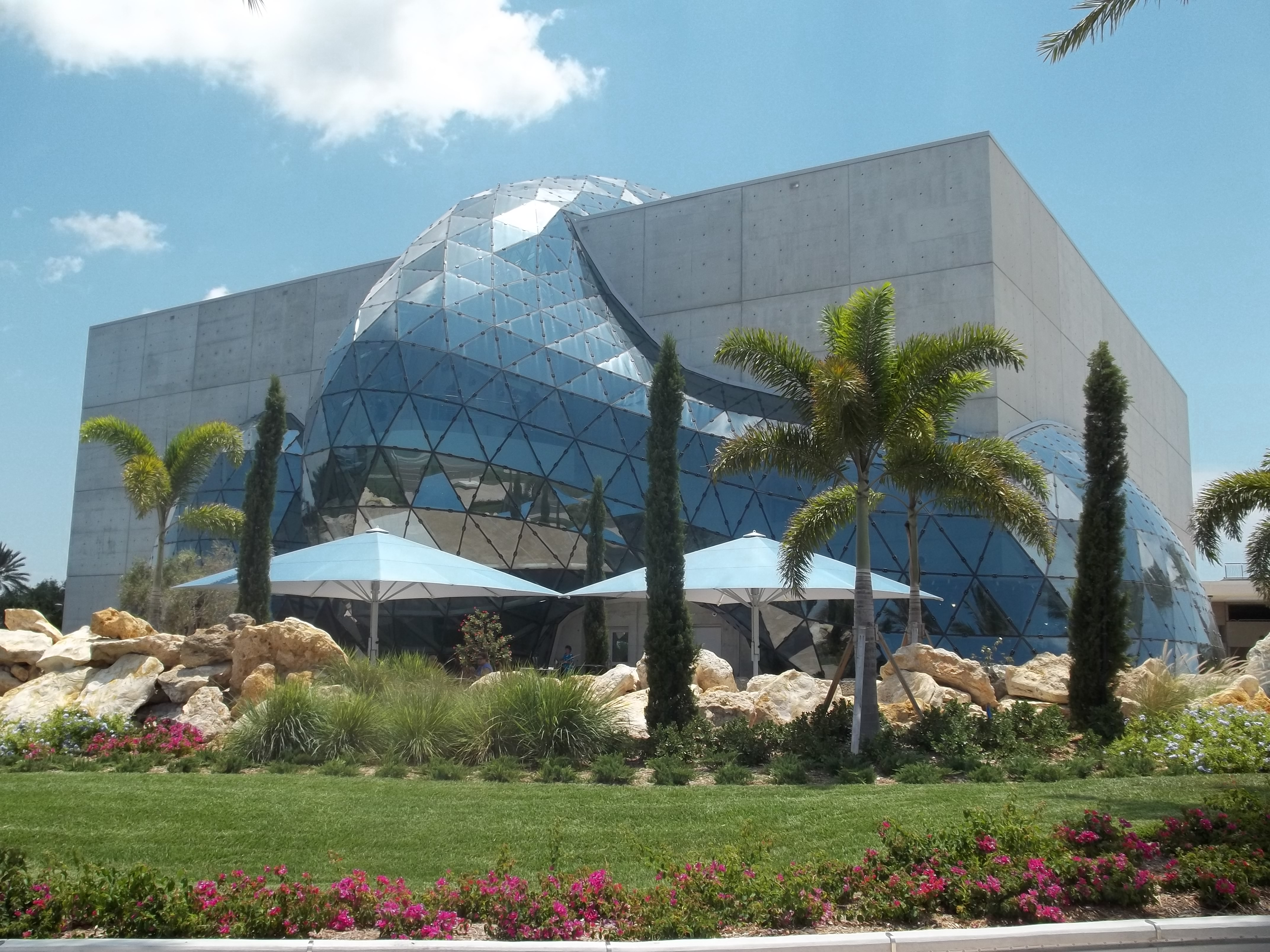
- The Salvador Dalí Museum features a spherical atrium at the entrance (2011).

- Location within Florida
- Established: March 7, 1982
- Location: St. Petersburg, Florida, US
- Coordinates: 27.7660°N 82.6315°W
- Type: Art museum
- Accreditation: AAM
- Architect: HOK
- Website: thedali.org
- Structural engineer: Walter P. Moore & Associates Inc.

The Salvador Dalí Museum is an American art museum in St. Petersburg, Florida, dedicated to the works of Spanish surrealist artist Salvador Dalí. Designed by HOK with Yann Weymouth and built by the Beck Group, the museum is located on the downtown St. Petersburg waterfront by 5th Avenue Southeast, Bay Shore Drive, and Dan Wheldon Way.

== Description ==
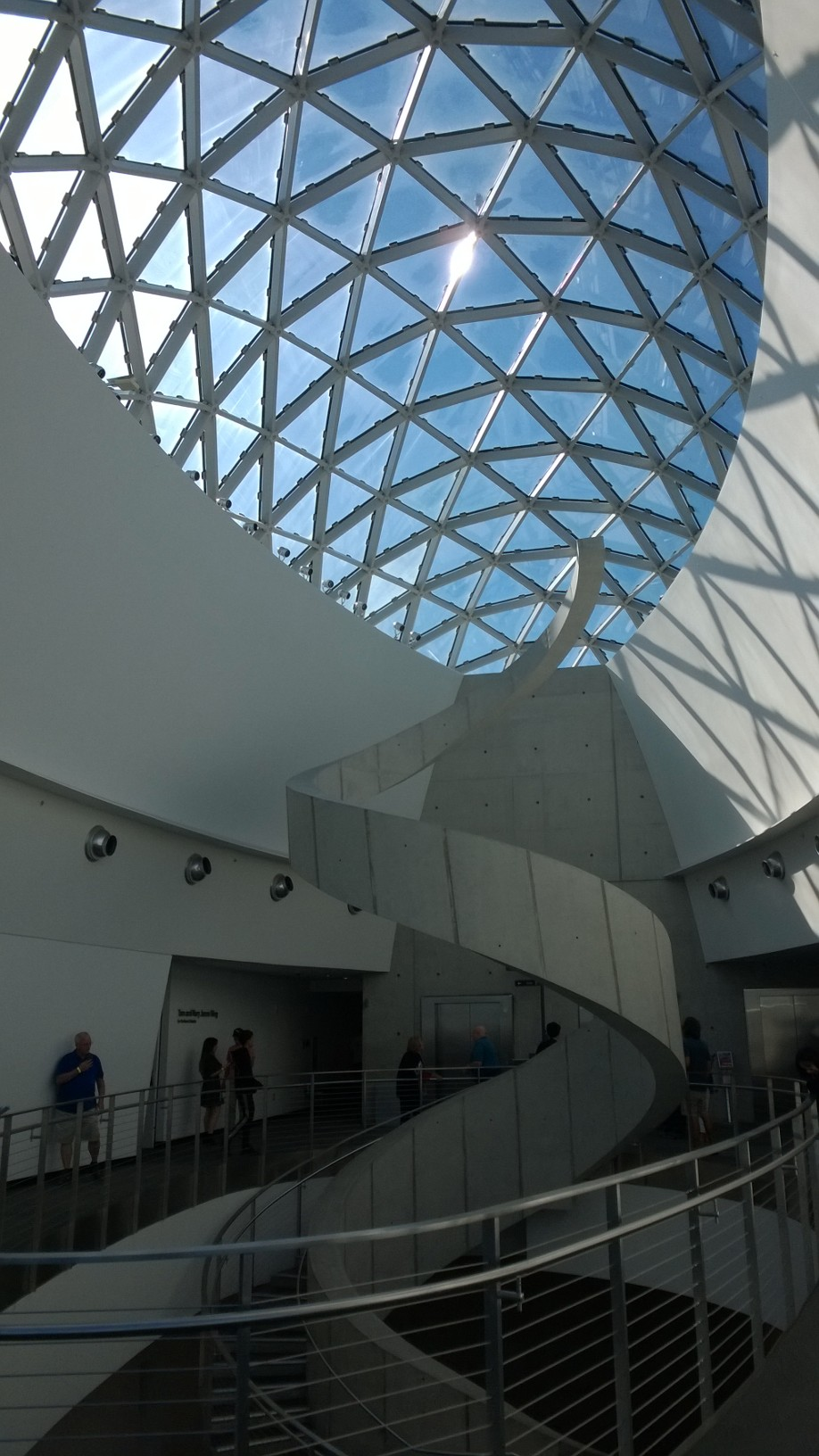
Interior view of entry atrium with spiral staircase.

Reportedly costing over $30 million, the surrealism-inspired museum structure features a large glass entryway and skylight made of 1.5-inch (38 mm) thick glass. Referred to as the "Enigma", the glass entryway is 75 feet (23 m) tall and encompasses a spiral staircase. The remaining walls are composed of 18-inch (460 mm) thick concrete, designed to protect the collection from hurricanes which hit the region occasionally.

The museum is a member of the American Alliance of Museums (AAM) and of the North American Reciprocal Museums program.

The museum offers a variety of family events, including performances, workshops, films, lectures, and food and drink events. At a holiday card workshop held at the museum, participants created their own Dali-themed holiday cards. In addition, there have been weekly poetry performances and lectures such as coffee with a curator, a presentation on a theme-oriented topic that discusses a variety of topics in relation to Dalí.

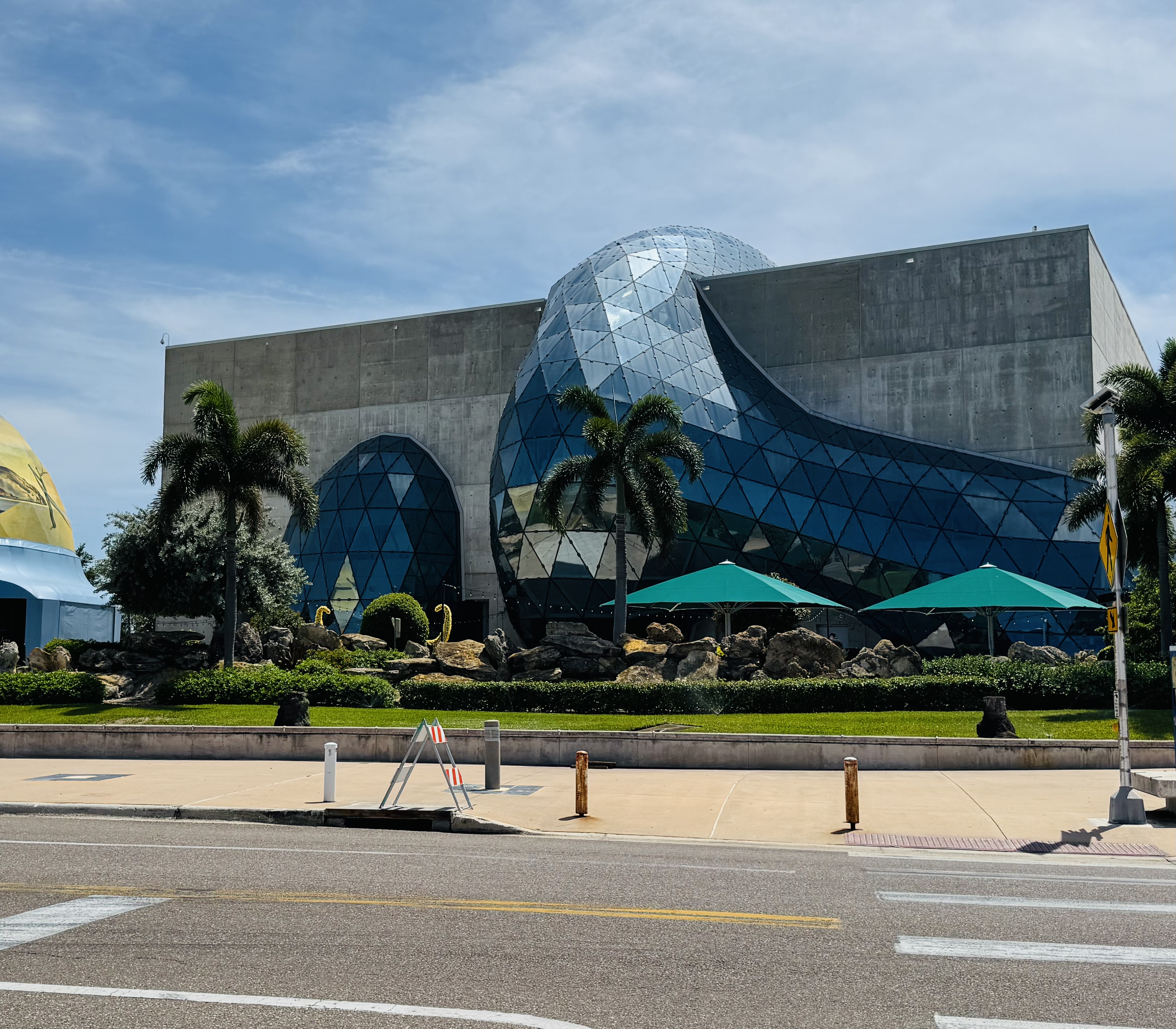
The Dalí Museum in 2026.

== History ==
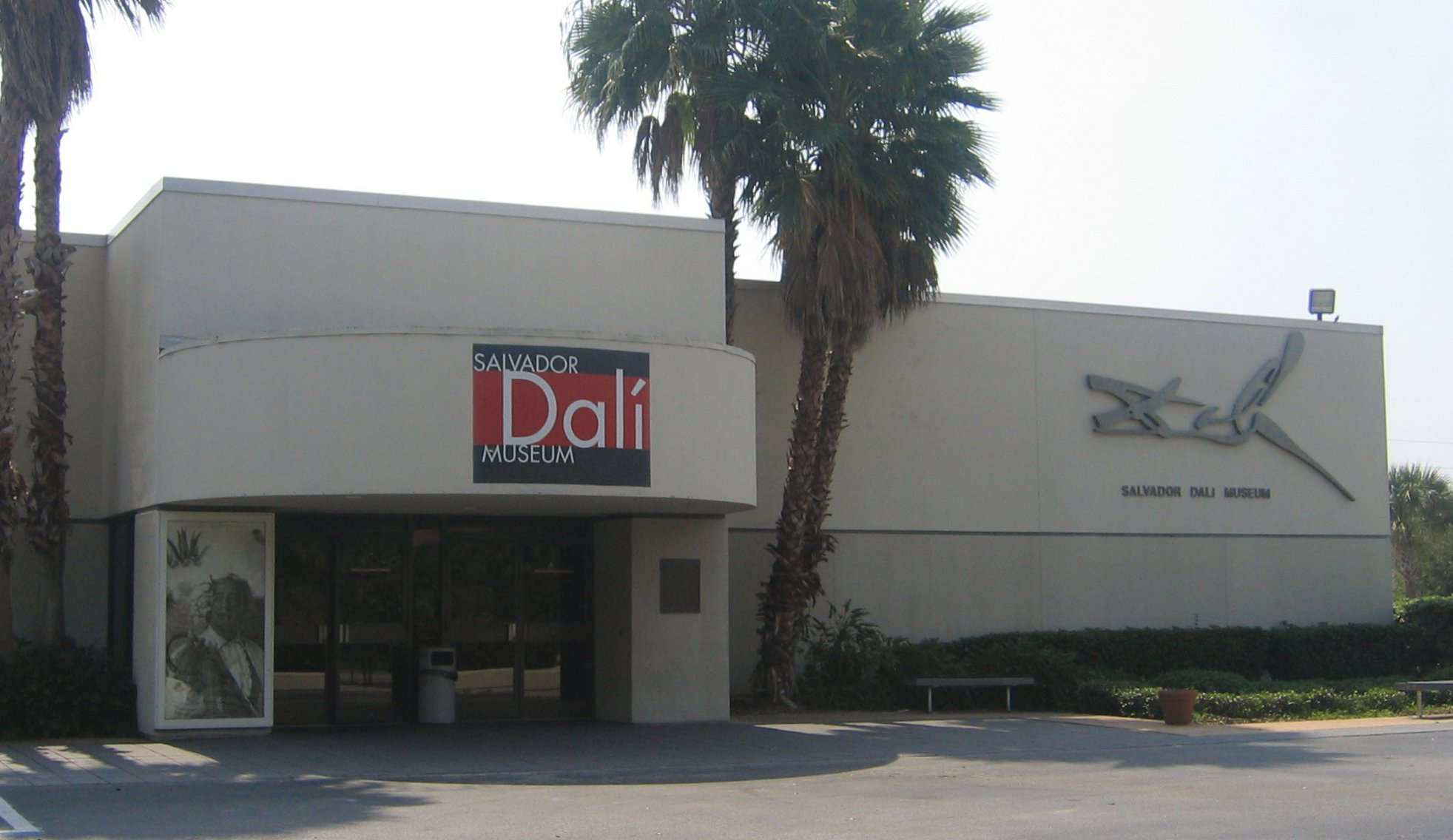
The old Salvador Dalí Museum facility in St Petersburg

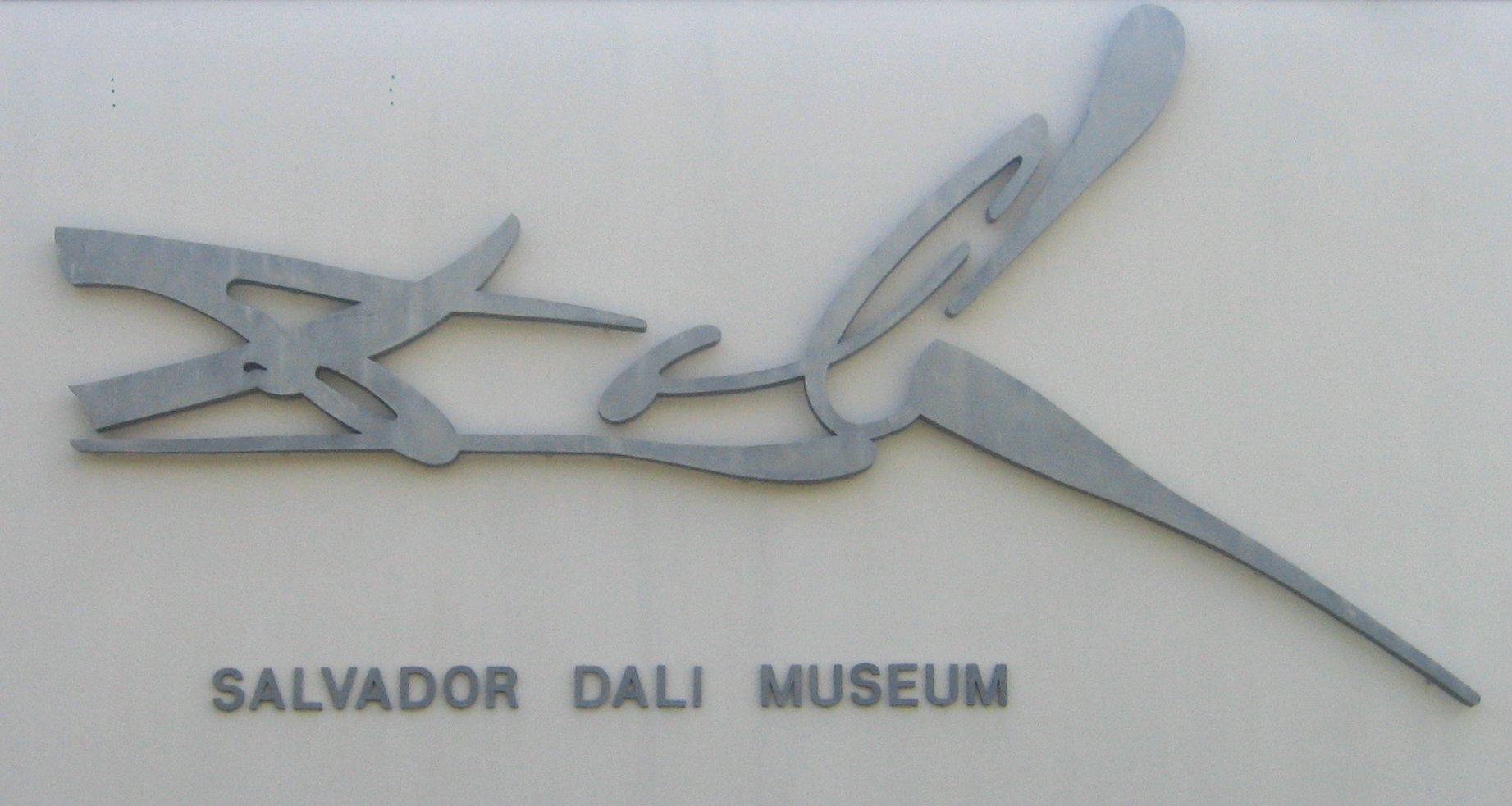
Salvador Dalí's signature as seen on the outside of the museum

Shortly before marrying in 1942, Reynolds and Eleanor Morse attended a Dalí retrospective at the Cleveland Museum of Art. Intrigued by the artist's subject matter, and impressed by his draftsmanship, they bought their first painting a year later. This purchase began a 40-year relationship as patrons and friends of Dalí that resulted in a comprehensive collection of original Dalí work.

Until 1971, the Morses displayed their collection in their Cleveland, Ohio, home.

In March 1971, with Salvador Dalí presiding over the opening, the Morses opened a museum adjacent to their office building in Beachwood, Ohio. By the end of the decade, with an overwhelming number of visitors, the Morses decided to again move their collection.

A Wall Street Journal article titled "U.S. Art World Dillydallies Over Dalí" caught the attention of the St. Petersburg, Florida, community, who rallied to bring the collection to the area. A marine warehouse in downtown St. Petersburg was rehabilitated and the museum opened on March 7, 1982, where it remained until 2010.

In mid-2008, a new location for the Dali museum was announced. A new building was designed by Yann Weymouth of the architectural firm Hellmuth, Obata and Kassabaum and built by The Beck Group under the leadership of then-CEO Henry C. Beck III. Located on the downtown waterfront next to the Mahaffey Theater, on the former site of the Bayfront Center (an arena which had been demolished in 2004), the new, larger, and more storm-secure museum was opened on January 11, 2011.

On April 18, 2012, the AIA's Florida Chapter placed the building on its list of Florida Architecture: 100 Years. 100 Places.

== Artworks ==
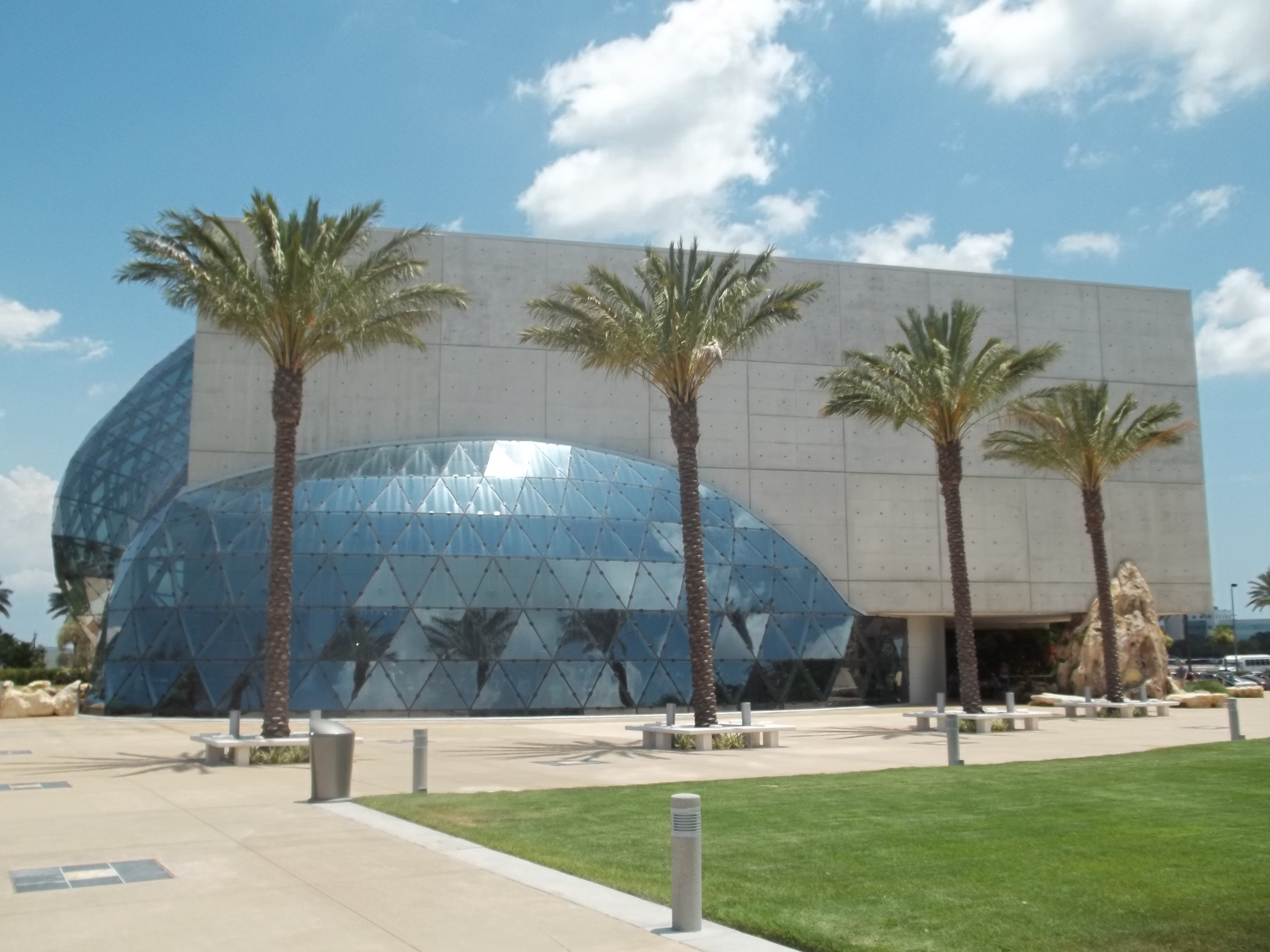
Side view of the Salvador Dalí Museum

The museum's collection includes 96 oil paintings, over 100 watercolors and drawings, 1,300 graphics, photographs, sculptures, and objets d'art, plus an extensive archival library. In July 2020, the museum added a new exhibit called "At Home with Dali". Permanent collection displays are periodically rotated, and several temporary shows are mounted each year.

The museum is home to more masterpieces of Dalí than any other museum in the world, including the large-scale paintings The Hallucinogenic Toreador, The Discovery of America by Christopher Columbus, The Ecumenical Council, Geopoliticus Child Watching the Birth of the New Man and The Disintegration of the Persistence of Memory.

In addition to displaying the work of Dalí, the museum aims to educate the public and promote understanding, enjoyment, and scholarly examination of art through the exhibition of works by Dalí and artists of similar vision.

With the exception of the Dalí Theater-Museum, created by Dalí himself in his hometown of Figueres in Spain, the St. Petersburg Dalí Museum has the world's largest collections of Dalí's works.

During the 2020 COVID-19 pandemic, the Salvador Dalí Museum made their gallery available for viewing online.

The Discovery of America by Christopher Columbus, 1958-59

=== Outreach and education ===
The museum offers outreach and education opportunities to the local schools and community. In the 2021–2022 school year their art mobile visited 20 Pinellas County schools, the summer program had 50 Title I students enrolled, and they sent volunteers to 31 local elementary schools for the Great American Teach In. In 2022, the museum partenered with Dartmouth College on eye-tracking software that could compare the way a guest looks at a painting and the way the curator looks at the same painting.

== Partnerships and publications ==
The museum offers several of its own publications in its store, primarily guidebooks and books about exhibitions. Avant-garde Studies is an annual online publication that covers talks and conferences presented at the museum, as well as peer-reviewed papers on avant-garde topics. The museum runs the Dalí Summer Rec Center Program for children aged 7 to 12. Opera at The Dalí arranges opera singers to perform on the helical staircase in the museum.

== Temporary exhibits ==
Picasso and the Allure of the South was on display from January 22, 2022, until May 22, 2022, and explored the influence of Southern Europe on Pablo Picasso’s artwork over six decades of his career. The exhibit included 79 paintings, drawings, and collages, and was organized in collaboration with the Musée national Picasso-Paris.

In 2023, the museum displayed a student surrealist exhibition, as it has each year since 1992 for students in Hillsborough County.

There is an indefinite exhibit of augmented reality. The museum has placed Dali's largest works in the collection in an app. When standing in front of the paintings, visitors can open the app and use their phone camera to scan the painting and see parts of the work highlighted, watch them move, and learn more about the figures within the art.

Another indefinite exhibit is the Dreams of Dali in Virtual Reality. Here participants put on VR headsets and step into some of Dali's work. Participants can walk around, through the desert, up the towers, and into hidden rooms within Dali's Archeological Reminiscences of Millet's "Angelus."

== See also ==
- Dalí Theatre and Museum – museum of Dalí in his home town of Figueres, Catalonia, Spain
- Gala Dali Castle Museum-House – in Púbol, Spain
- Dalí Paris – in Paris, France, museum of Dalí's drawings and sculptures
- Dalí – Die Ausstellung am Potsdamer Platz – in Berlin, Germany: more than 450 original artworks by Salvador Dalí
- List of single-artist museums
