= Van Helmont =

Van Helmont is a Dutch and Flemish surname. It may refer to:

- Jan van Helmont (1650 – between 1714 and 1734), a Flemish painter
- Jan Baptist van Helmont (1580 - 1644), a Flemish chemist, physiologist, and physician
- Franciscus Mercurius van Helmont (1614 - 1699) a Flemish alchemist and writer, the son of Jan Baptist van Helmont
- Mattheus van Helmont (1623 - after 1685), a Flemish painter
- Zeger Jacob van Helmont (1683 - 1726), a Flemish painter
