= Helmont =

Helmont is the surname of the following people:

- Jan van Helmont (painter) (1650–c.1724), Flemish painter
- Jan Baptist van Helmont (1580–1644) was an early modern period Flemish chemist, physiologist, and physician.
- Franciscus Mercurius van Helmont (d.1698) was his son, who made his work famous, though he was imprisoned for publishing his works
- Mattheus van Helmont (1623 – after 1685), was a Flemish Baroque painter and relative of the former, who became known for his genre paintings featuring alchemists.
- Zeger Jacob van Helmont (1683–1726), was a relative of the former, and himself an 18th-century painter from the Southern Netherlands specialized in historical allegories.
