= Jan van Helmont =

Jan van Helmont may refer to:

- Jan van Helmont (painter) (1650 – after 1714), Flemish painter
- Jan Baptist van Helmont (1580–1644), Flemish chemist, physiologist, and physician
