= Adriaen Rombouts =

17th century artist

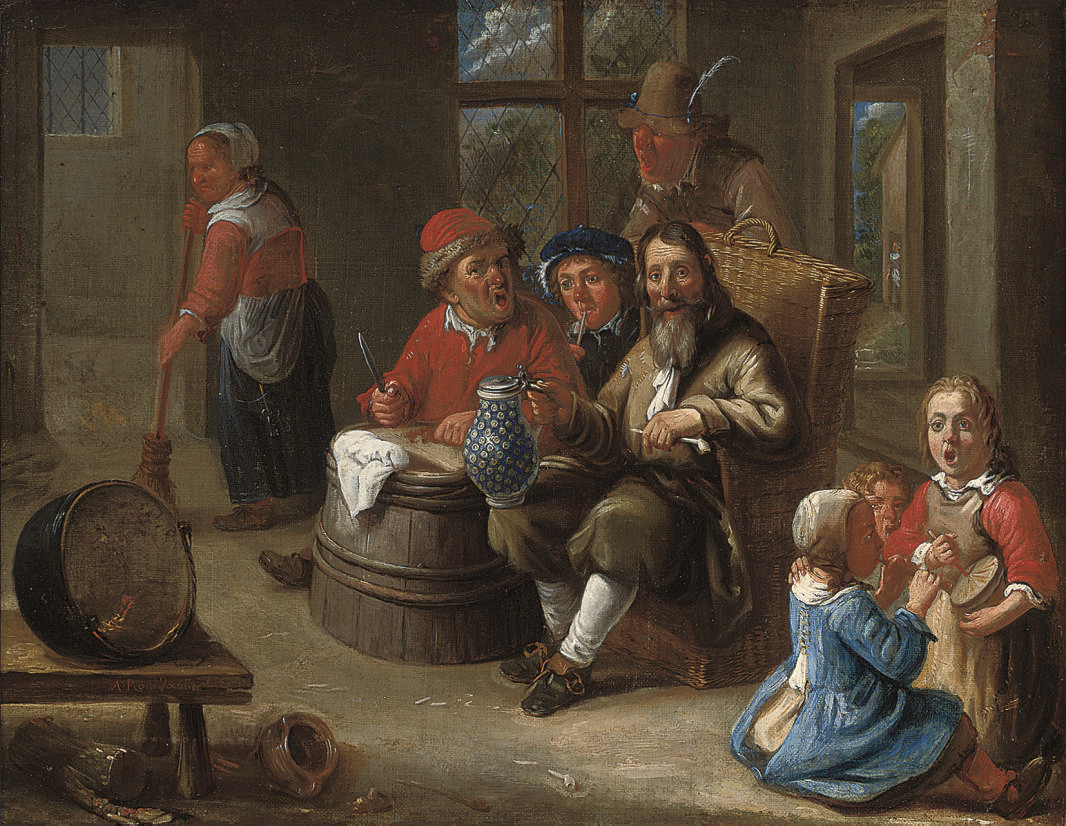
Peasants smoking and drinking with children making music

Adriaen Rombouts (c. 1640 – in or after 1670) was a Flemish Baroque painter active in Brussels in the middle of the 17th century. He is known for his indoor genre scenes with peasants engaging in play, eating and drinking.

== Life ==
Very little is known about the life of Rombouts. He was likely born sometime around 1640. He became in 1653–1654 a pupil of Joos van Craesbeeck in Brussels. Van Craesbeeck was a prominent genre painter who had trained with Adriaen Brouwer and had moved from Antwerp to Brussels around 1650.

The last known dated work of Rombouts is dated 1670. It is not known when or where the artist died.

== Work ==
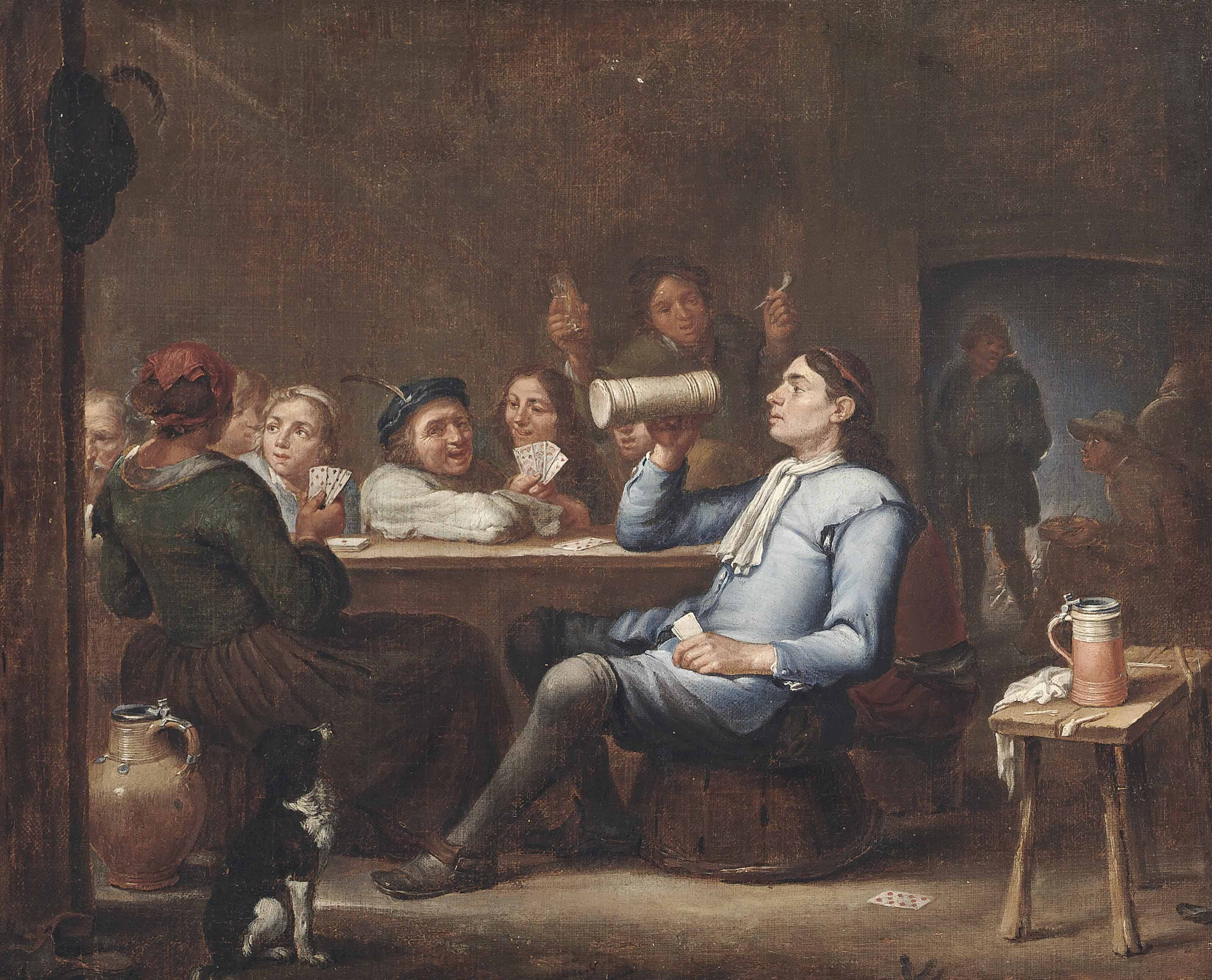
Peasants drinking and playing cards in a tavern

Adriaen Rombouts painted scenes with peasants engaging in play, eating and drinking at home or in taverns. He also painted a portrait of the fool of a Brussels chamber of rhetoric.

Some paintings attributed to him are now attributed to other artists. This includes A doctor performing a back operation, watched by country folk (Wellcome Library), which is now attributed to the anonymous Antwerp artist referred to as the Monogrammist H.C.
