= Tronie =

Type of Dutch / Flemish Baroque painting

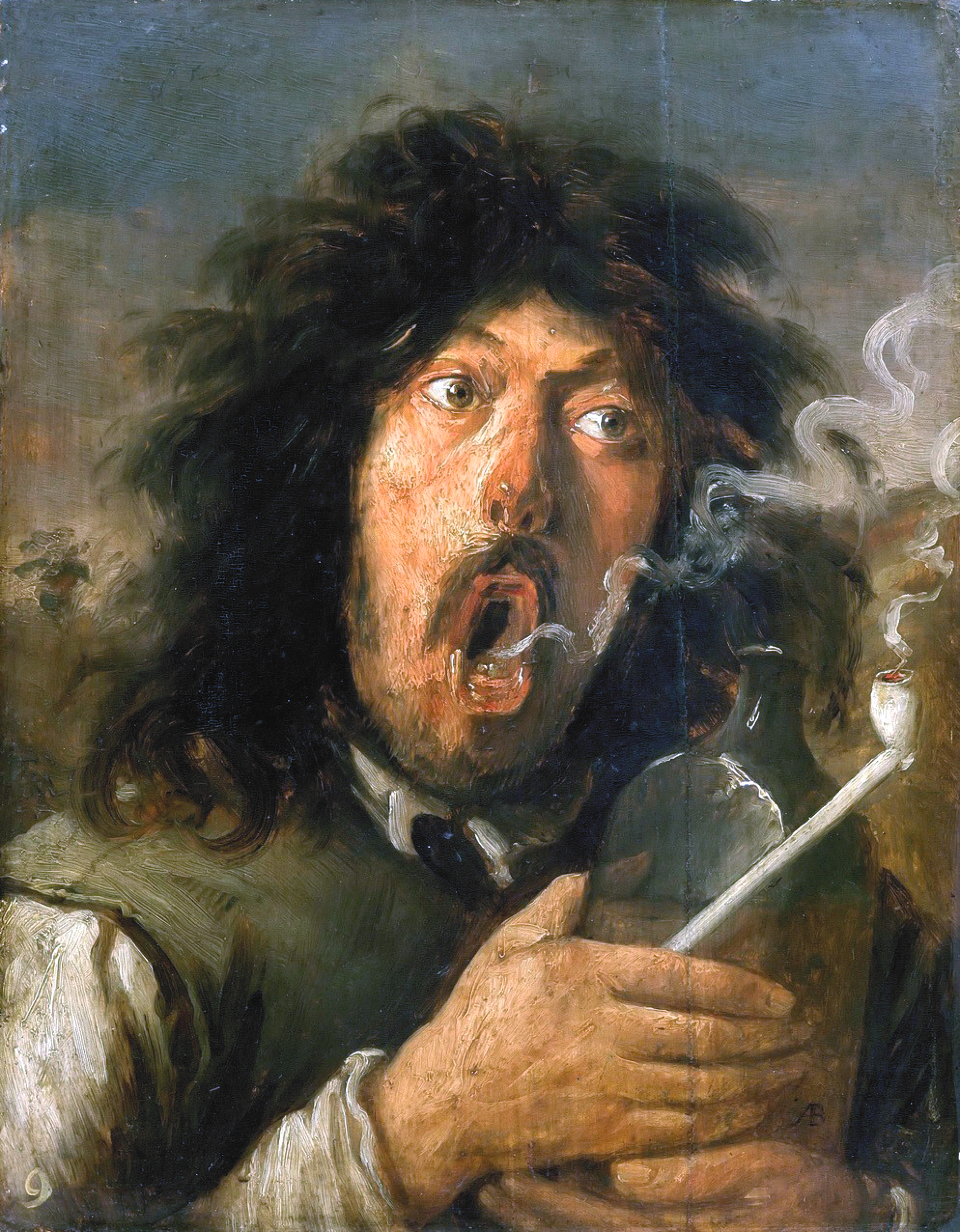
The Smoker, Joos van Craesbeeck

A tronie (Dutch pronunciation: [ˈtroːni]) is a type of work in Dutch Golden Age painting and Flemish Baroque painting that depicts an exaggerated facial expression or people in costume. These works were not intended as portraits or caricatures but as studies of expression, type, physiognomy or an interesting character such as an old man or woman, a young woman, the soldier, the shepherdess, the "Oriental", or a person of a particular race.

The main goal of the artists who created tronies was to achieve a lifelike representation of the figures and to show off their illusionistic abilities through the free use of color, strong light contrasts, or a peculiar color scheme. Tronies conveyed different meanings and values to their viewers. Tronies embodied abstract notions such as transience, youth, and old age, but could also function as positive or negative examples of human qualities, such as wisdom, strength, piety, folly, or impulsiveness. These works were very popular in Holland and Flanders and were produced as independent works for the free market.

== Definition ==
The term tronie is not clearly defined in art historical literature. In 16th- or 17th-century Dutch 'tronie' was a neutral reference to a "head", "face" or "facial expression". It could also have a more negative connotation as denoting a face causing fear, disgust, mockery or amusement. This meaning of the word is still retained in contemporary Dutch. The term tronie was related to the middle-French word "trogne" or "trongne" meaning "mug" or "snout".

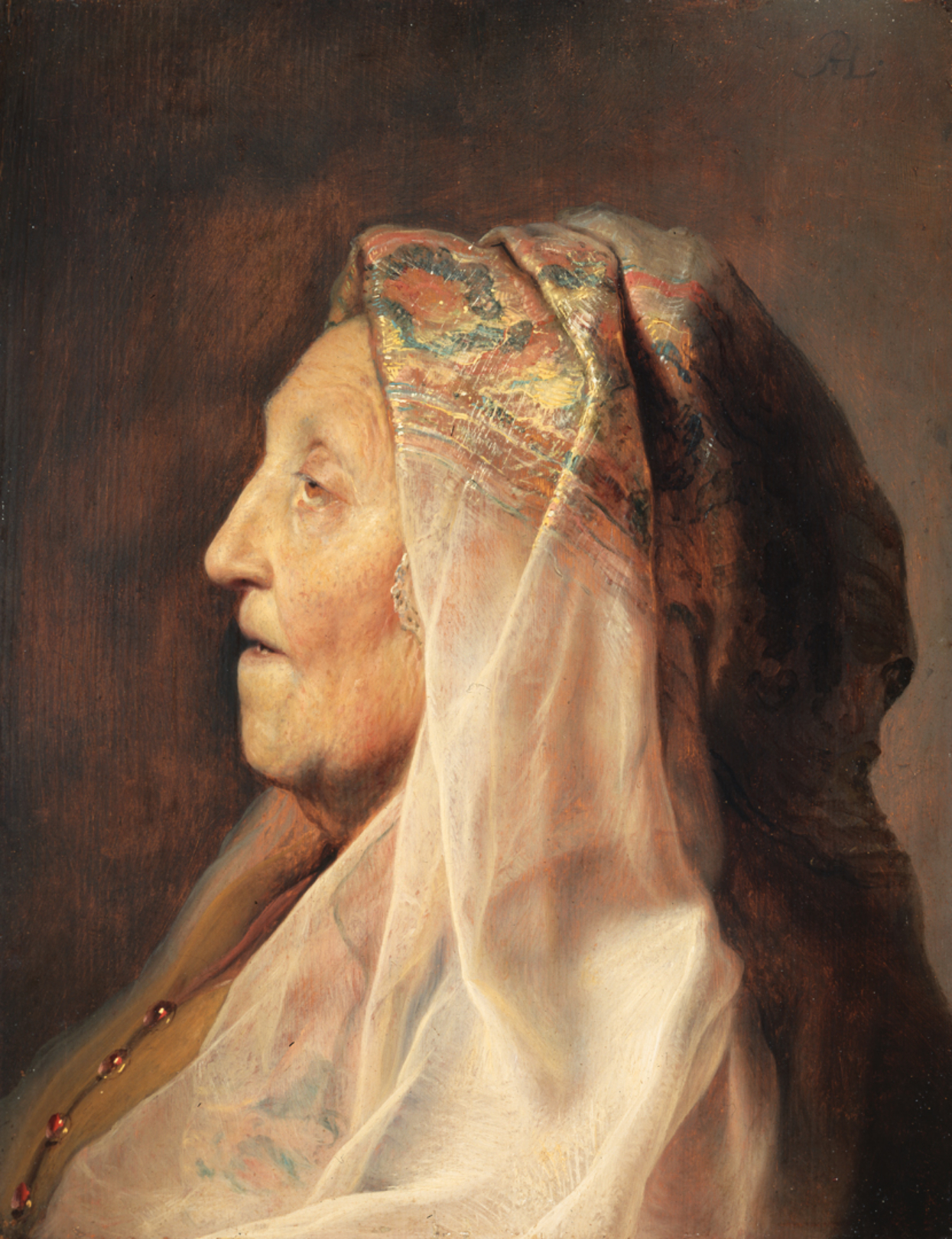
Profile Head of an Old Woman, Jan Lievens

In the context of the visual arts, literary and archival sources show that initially the term 'tronie' was not always associated with the depiction of people. Inventories sometimes referred to flower and fruit still lifes as tronies. More common was the meaning of face or visage. Often the term referred to the entire head, even a bust, and in exceptional cases the whole body. A tronie could be two-dimensional, but also made of plaster or stone. Sometimes a tronie was a likeness or depiction of an individual, including the face of God, Christ, Mary, a saint or an angel. In particular, a tronie denoted the characteristic appearance of the head of a type, such as a farmer, beggar or jester. Tronie sometimes meant a grotesque head or model, such as an ugly old person. When conceived as the face of an individual or of a type, a tronie's aim was to express feelings and character in an accurate manner and must therefore be expressive. In modern art-historical usage, the term tronie is typically restricted to figures not intended to depict an identifiable person, so it is a form of genre painting in a portrait format. Typically a painted head or bust only, if concentrating on the facial expression, but often half-length when featured in an exotic costume, tronies may be based on studies from life or use the features of actual sitters. The picture was typically sold on the art market without identification of the sitter, and was not commissioned and retained by the sitter as portraits normally were. Similar unidentified figures treated as history paintings would normally be given a title from the classical world, for example the Rembrandt painting now known as Saskia as Flora.

== History ==
The genre started in the Low Countries in the 16th century where it was likely inspired by some of the grotesque heads drawn by Leonardo. Leonardo had pioneered drawings of paired grotesque heads whereby two heads, usually in profile, were placed opposite each other in order to accentuate their diversity. This paired juxtaposition was also adopted by artists in the Low Countries. In 1564 or 1565 Joannes and Lucas van Doetecum are believed to have engraved 72 heads attributed to Pieter Brueghel the Elder that followed this paired arrangement.

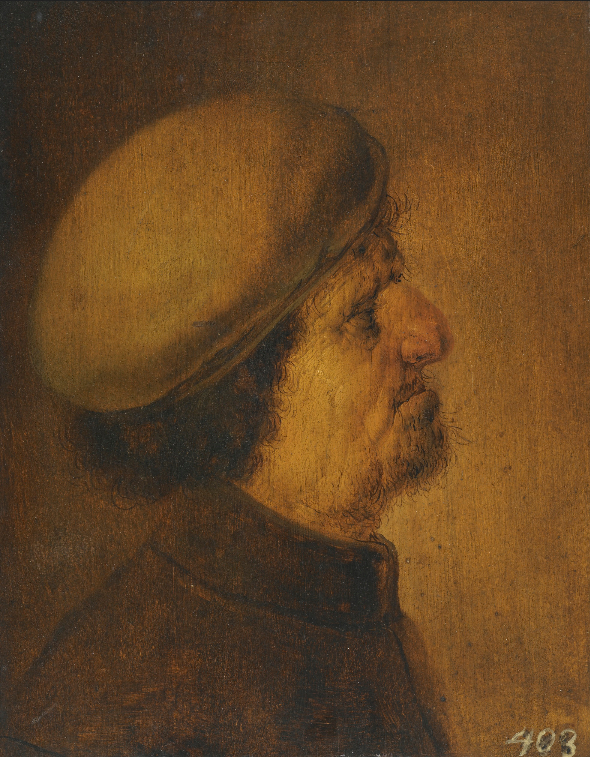
Jan van de Venne

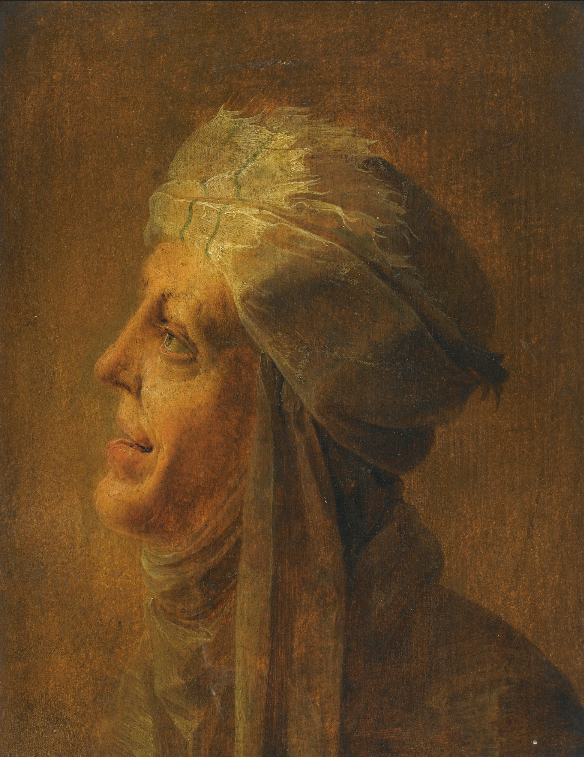
Heads of an old man and a woman by Jan van de Venne

This paired model was still being used by some artists in the 17th century. For instance, the Flemish artist Jan van de Venne who was active in the first half of the 17th century painted a number of tronies juxtaposing different faces.

In the 16th century, painters created tronies, which they painted from live models to be used for the figures of large history paintings. Many artists made collections of character heads as preparatory studies for paintings, especially history paintings. The Flemish painter Frans Floris' distinctive head studies had become a form of authorial achievement by 1562. While Floris made the head studies both for his own use and for the students and assistants in his workshop, some were clearly also created as works of art in their own right. The rapid, expressive brushwork of these panels suggests that he painted some heads as independent creative studies, and as such they anticipate the tronies of the 17th century. These studies became collector's items for local art lovers. Floris head studies testify to the self-conscious artistic culture of Antwerp, where they were valued more for their authorship than for their preparatory value.

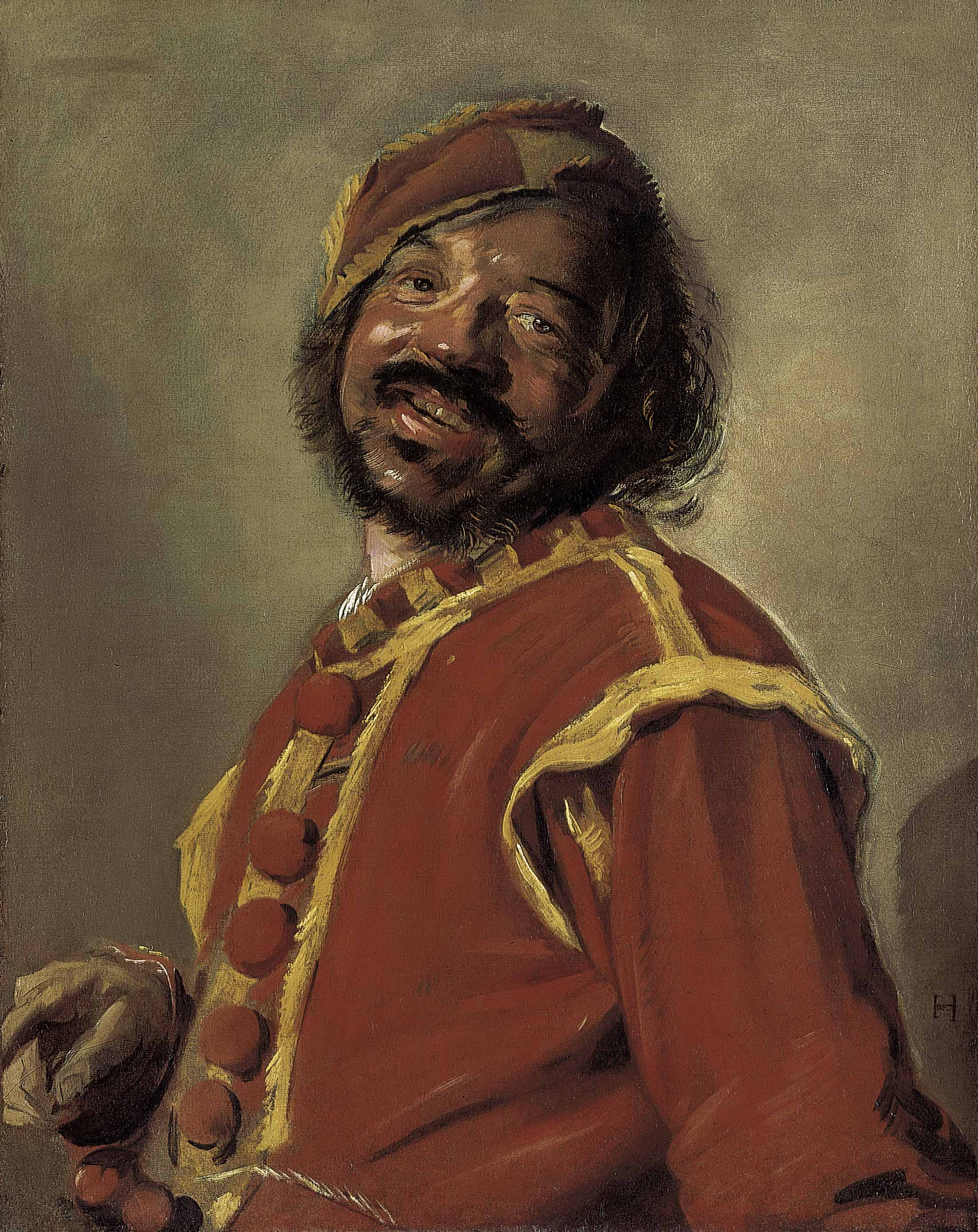
Peeckelhaering (The Merry Reveler), Frans Hals

Ín the 17th century these studies of faces became an art form in their own right in the Dutch Republic. The most important artistic precursors of tronies, which were produced in Leiden and Haarlem in the 1620s, include painted and drawn study heads of the 16th and early 17th centuries. It was Jan Lievens who initiated tronie production in Leiden. Starting from his own single-figure genre and history paintings in half-figures, Lievens limited the subject of the painting to the representation of a head or a bust. He took his cue from the Flemish study heads of masters such as Rubens and van Dyck. The emergence of the tronie as the result of a reduction of larger compositions was also evident in the work of Frans Hals, a Haarlem painter. Some of Frans Hals's tronies are his best-known works such as the Gypsy Girl. Other Haarlem painters who painted tronies include Pieter de Grebber, Adriaen van Ostade and Franchoys Elaut. The practice of tronies as independent artworks was well known by Flemish painters. It cannot be ruled out that the genre of the tronie as an independent art form emerged earlier in Flanders than in Holland. Flemish painters Rubens, van Dyck, and Jordaens are known to have used painted head studies in larger working contexts. However, some of these works were also intended as independent expressive studies.

The making of tronies spread and developed into an independent art form around Rembrandt. There was a lucrative market for tronies in the Netherlands. The price of tronies was lower than that of other types of paintings, which brought them within the reach of a wider audience. Several Rembrandt self-portrait etchings are tronies, as are paintings of himself, his son and his wives. Three Vermeer paintings were described as "tronies" in the Dissius auction of 1696, perhaps including the Girl with a Pearl Earring and the Washington Young Girl with a flute.

Adriaen Brouwer was a successful practitioner of the genre as he had a talent for expressiveness. His work gave a face to lower-class figures by infusing their images with recognizable and vividly expressed human emotions such as anger, joy, pain, and pleasure. His Youth Making a Face (c. 1632/1635, National Gallery of Art) shows a young man with a satirical and mocking gesture which humanises him, however uninviting he may appear. Brouwer's vigorous application of paint in this composition, with his characteristically short, unmodulated brushstrokes, increases the dramatic effect. Tronie painters often returned to the traditional theme of the allegory of the five senses and created series of tronies depicting the five senses. Examples are Lucas Franchoys the Younger's A man removing a plaster, the sense of touch and Joos van Craesbeeck's The Smoker which represents taste.

The tronie is related to, and has some overlap with, the "portrait historié", a portrait of a real person as another, usually historical or mythological, figure. Jan de Bray specialised in these, and such portraits often showed aristocratic ladies as mythological figures.

== Gallery ==
Examples of tronies

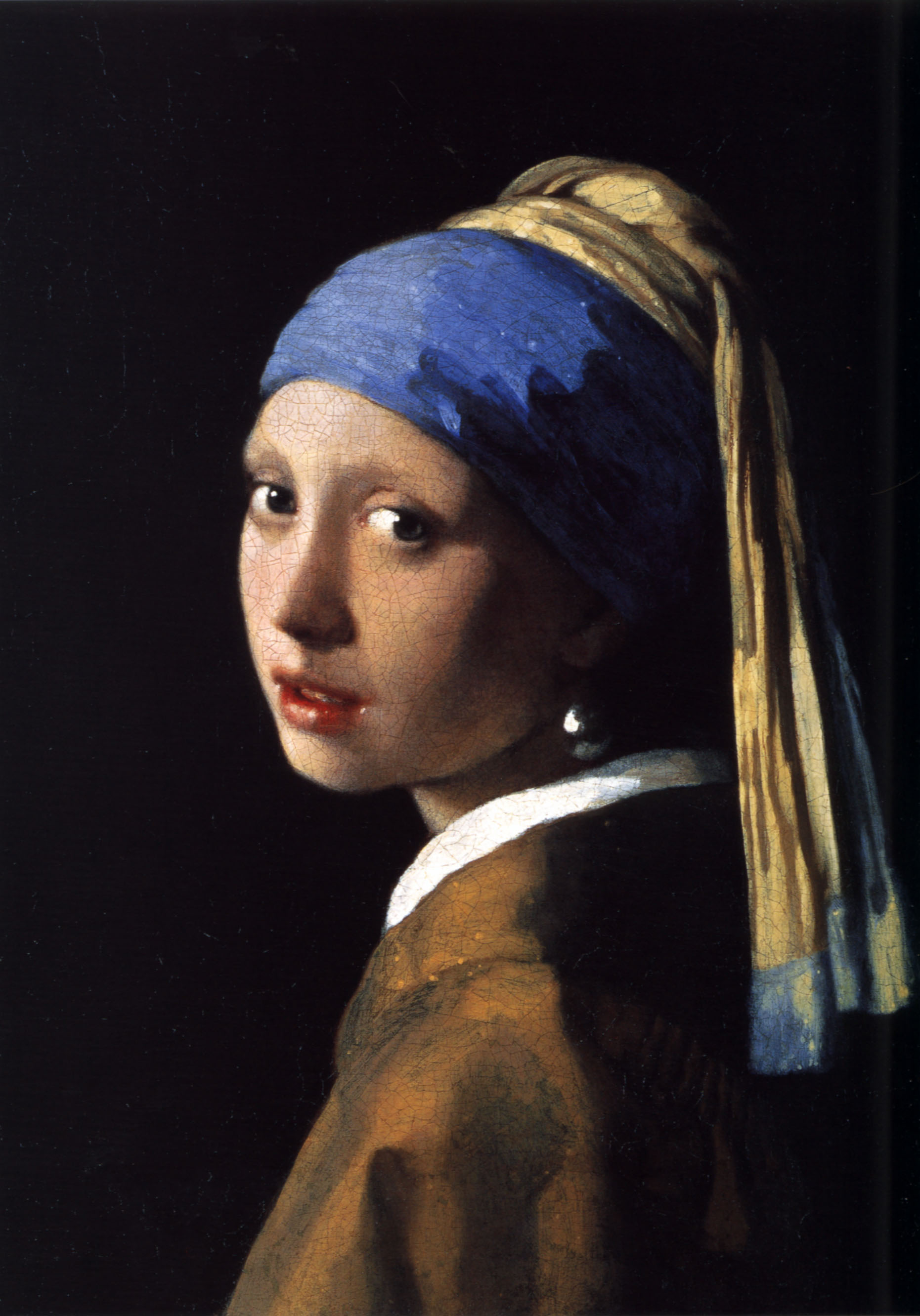
Johannes Vermeer, Girl with a Pearl Earring, c. 1665

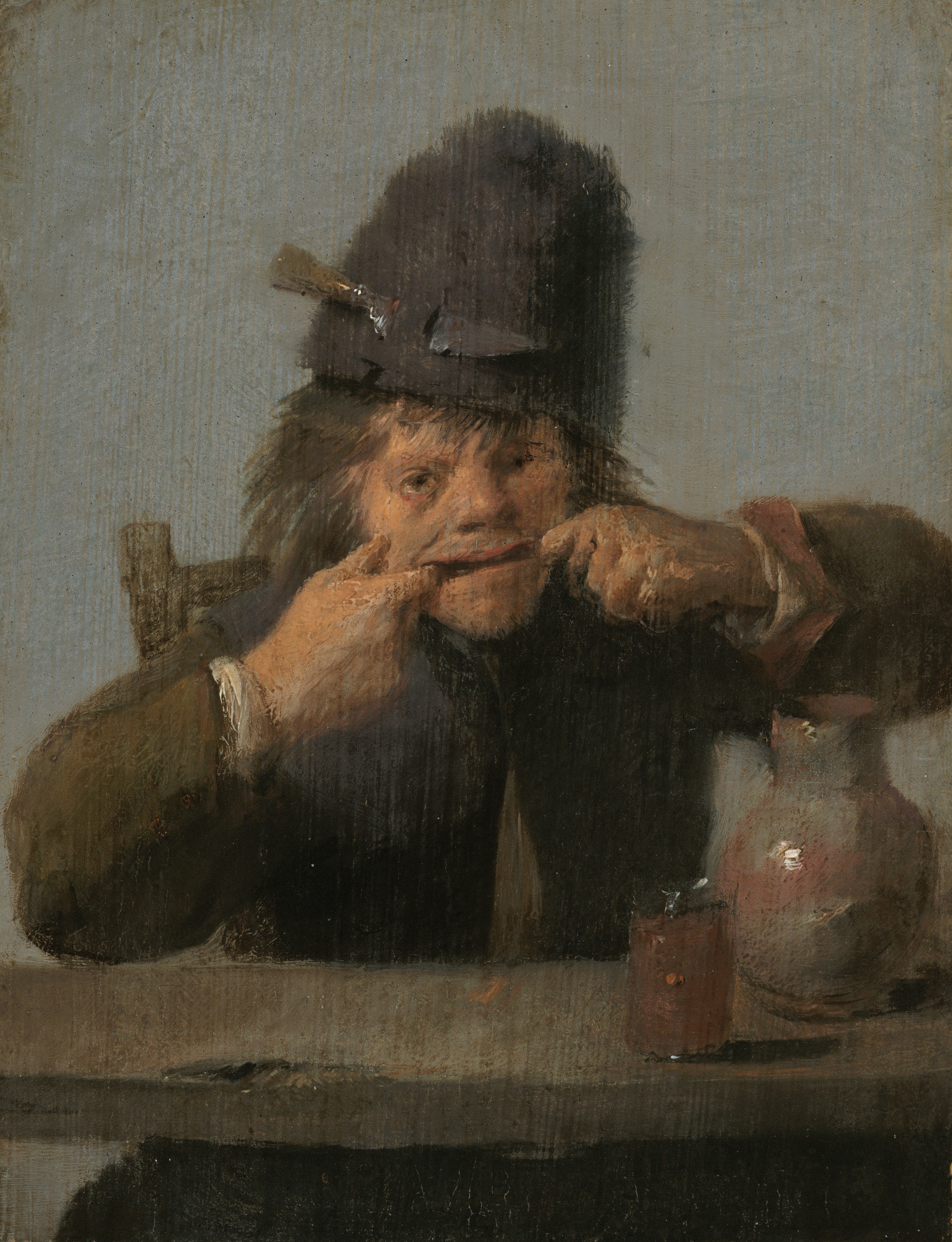
Adriaen Brouwer, Youth Making a Face

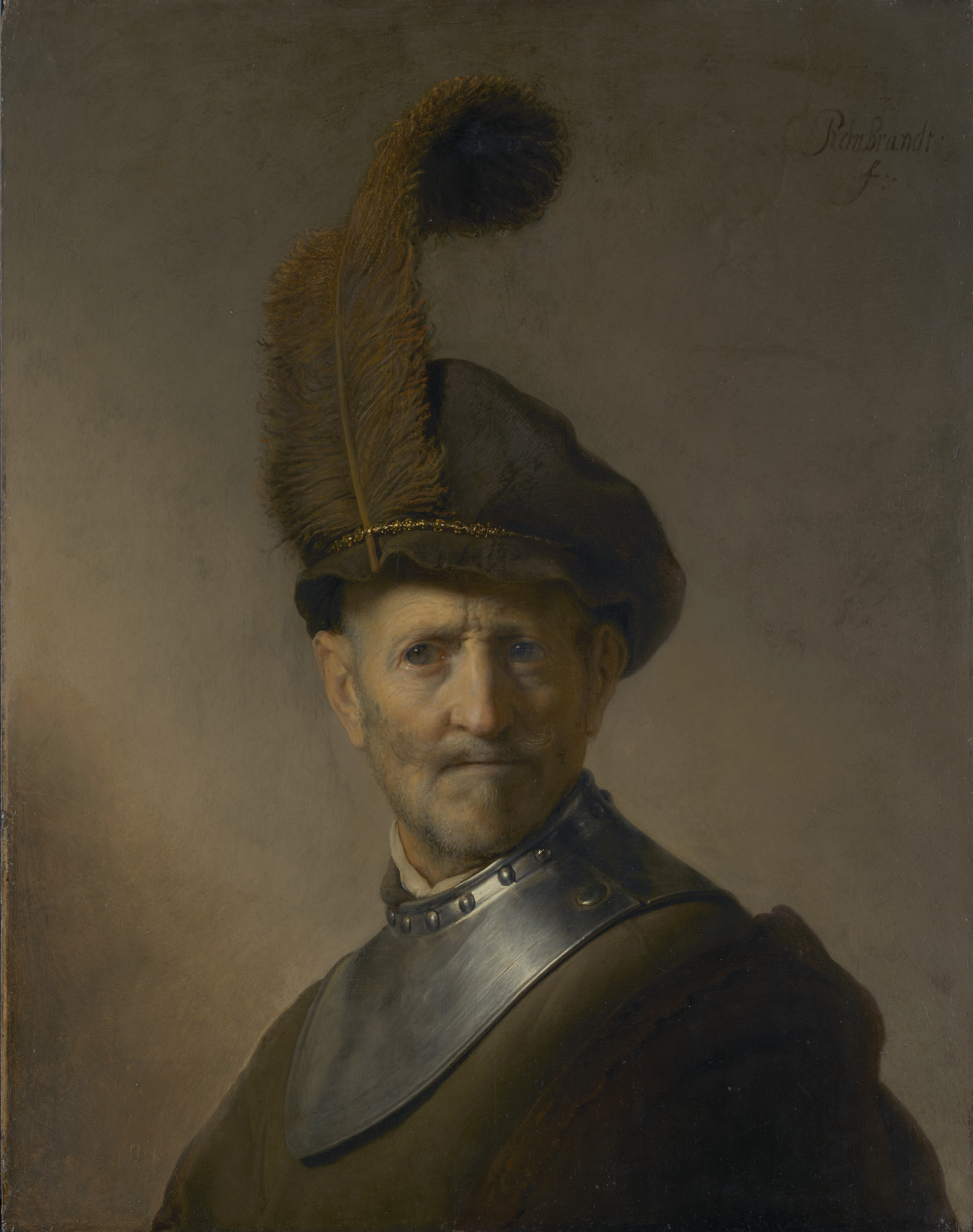
Rembrandt, Old Man in Military Costume

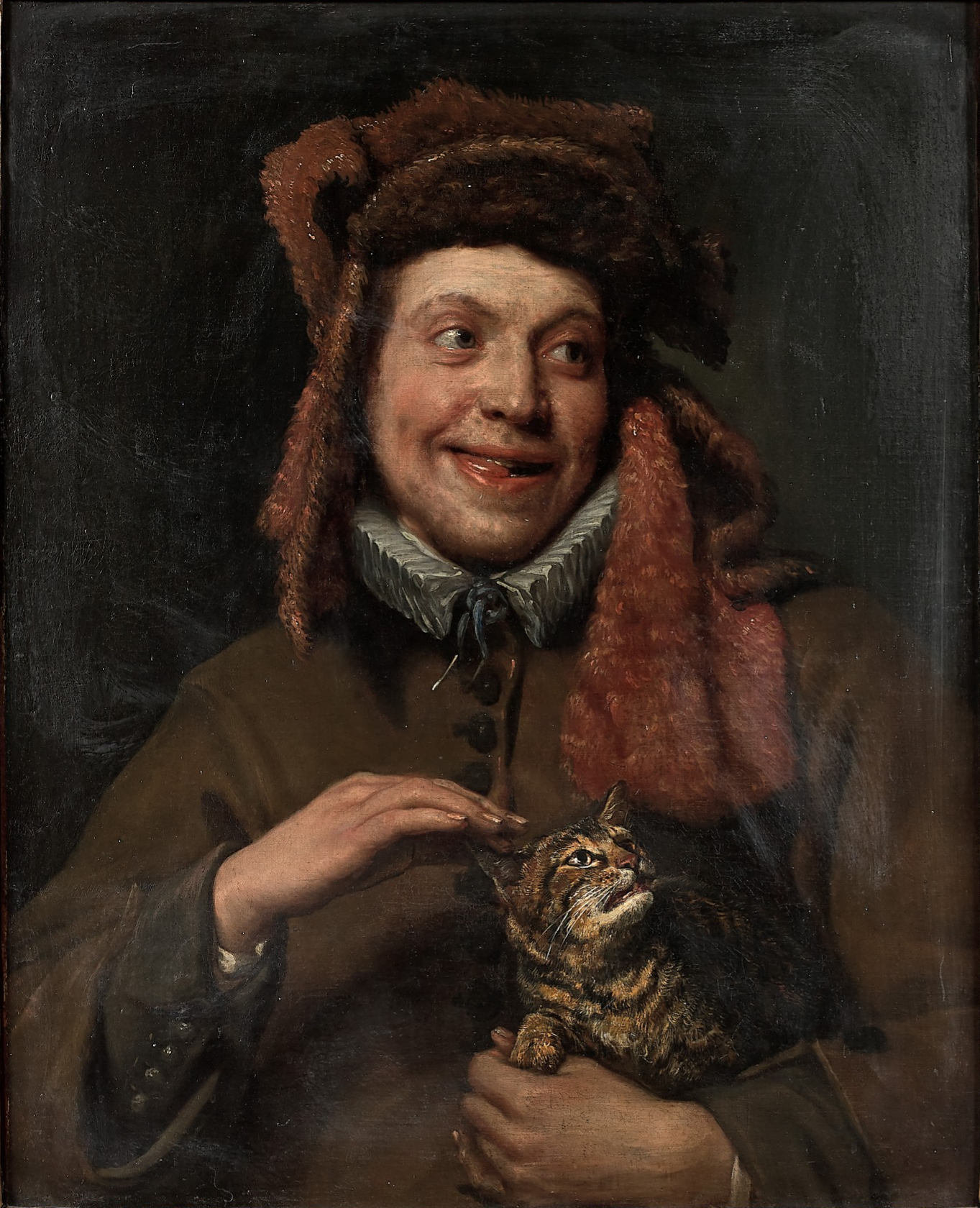
Michiel Sweerts, Portrait of a young man holding a cat (Allegory of touch)

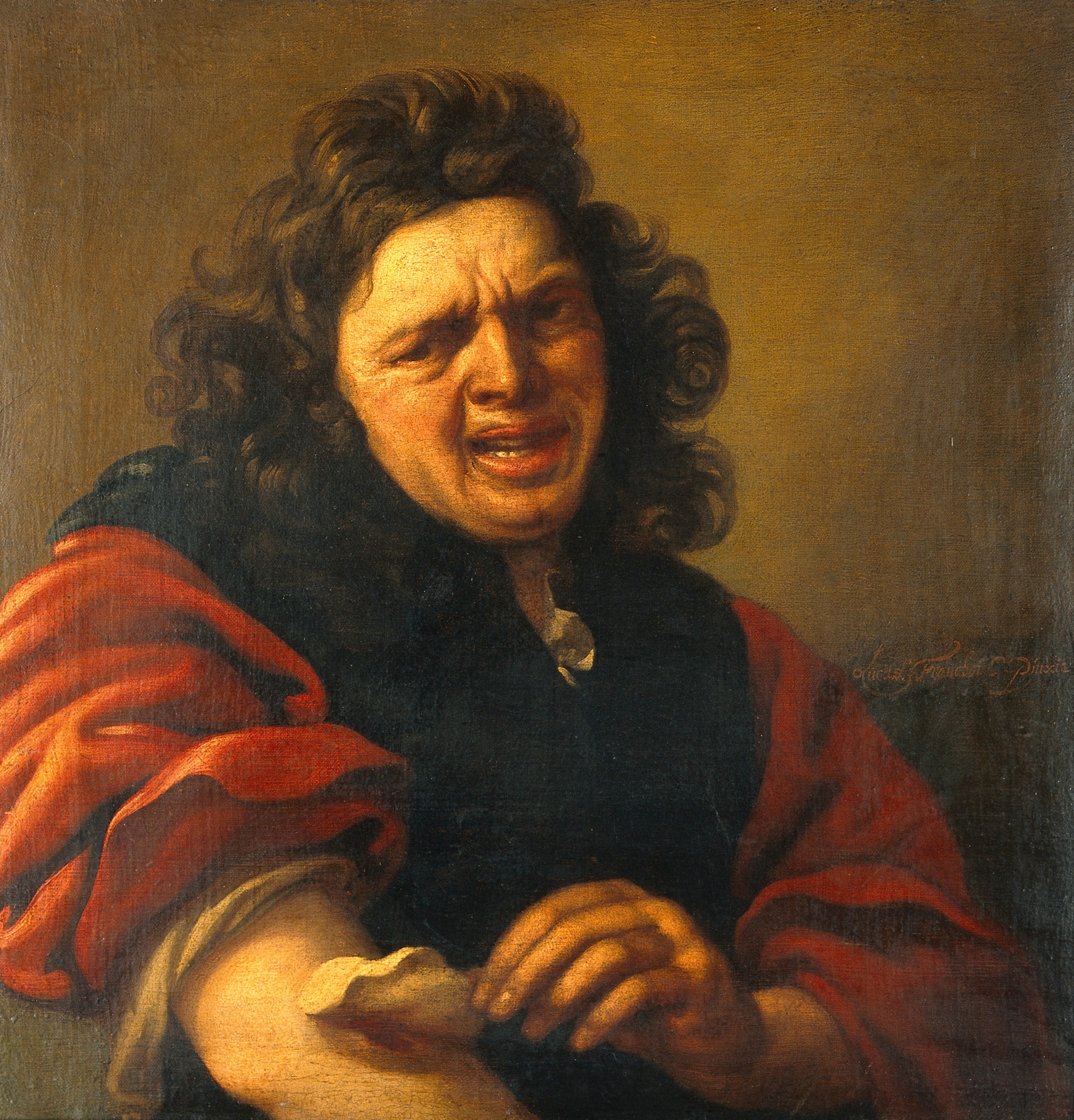
Lucas Franchoys the Younger, Man removing a plaster, the sense of touch

== See also ==
- Joseph Ducreux – French 18th century portraitist whose less formal works use extreme expressions
- Franz Xaver Messerschmidt – Austrian sculptor best known for his extreme "character heads"

== Sources ==
- Hirschfelder, Dagmar: Tronie und Porträt in der niederländischen Malerei des 17. Jahrhunderts. Berlin: Gebr. Mann Verlag, 2008. ISBN 978-3-7861-2567-9
- Gottwald, Franziska: Das Tronie. Muster - Studie - Meisterwerk. Die Genese einer Gattung der Malerei vom 15. Jahrhundert bis zu Rembrandt, München/Berlin: Deutscher Kunstverlag, 2009. ISBN 978-3-422-06930-5
- Hirschfelder, Dagmar / Krempel, León (Eds.): Tronies. Das Gesicht in der Frühen Neuzeit, Berlin: Gebr. Mann Verlag, 2013.
