= Franchoys Elaut =

Dutch painter (1589–1635)

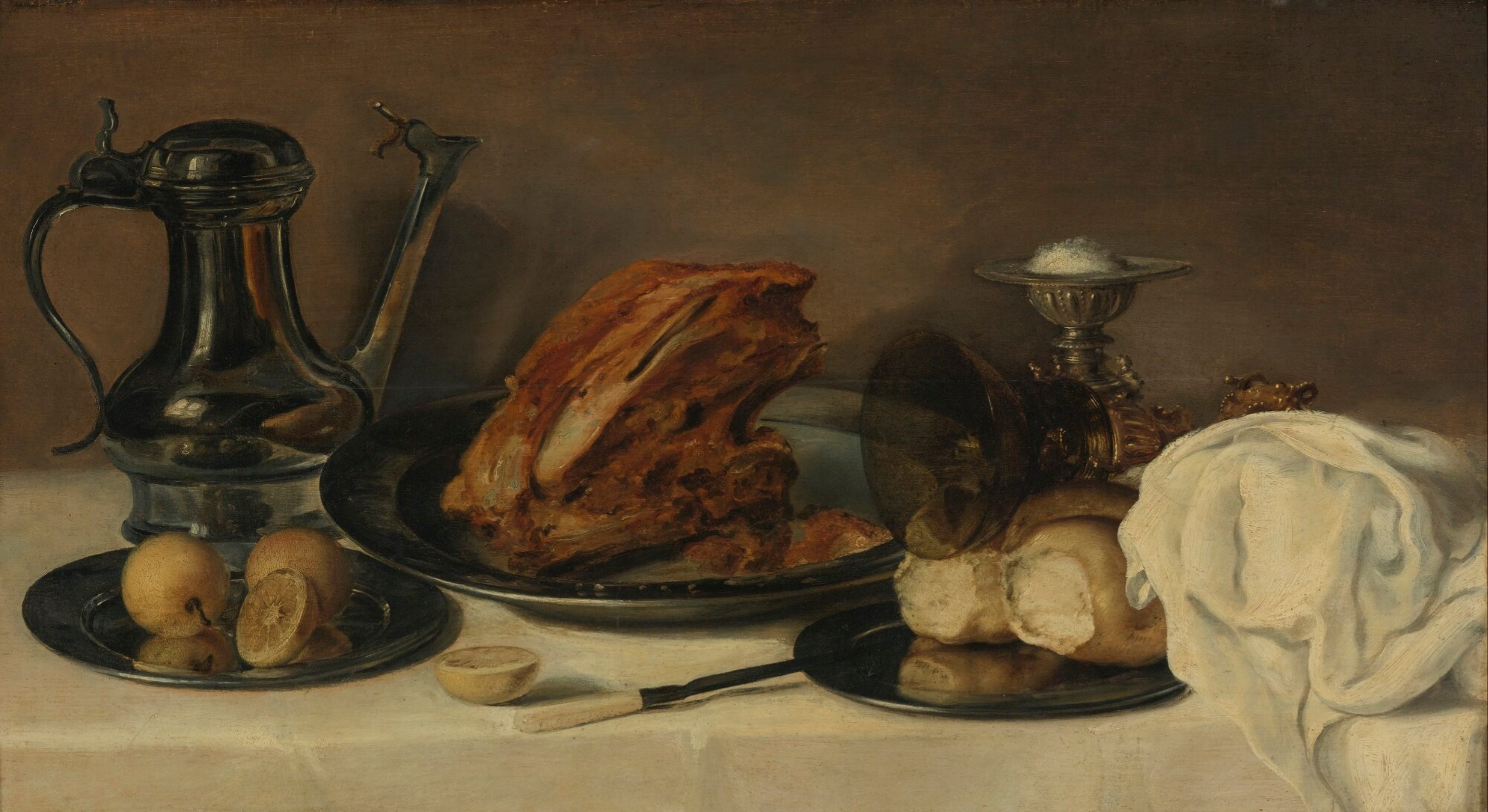
Still life with a pewter jug, a ham and other objects on a table

Franchoys Elaut (baptized 27 August 1589, in Haarlem – buried on 22 September 1635, in Haarlem) was a Dutch still life painter active in Haarlem. He is known for his monochrome banquet style still lifes, merry company paintings and so-called tronies, i.e. portrait-like paintings of certain facial or figure types or emotions. His work shows the influence of other Haarlem painters of his time who painted similar subjects.

== Life ==
Franchoys Elaut was born in Haarlem as the son of Franchoys Eelhaut and Josijnken Potter, both originally from Ghent in Flanders. The profession of his father is not known. On 30 June 1616 he was 'emancipated' by his father which meant that he could from then onwards handle his affairs on his own. On 17 December 1628 he married Anneken Jans. The couple had two daughters.

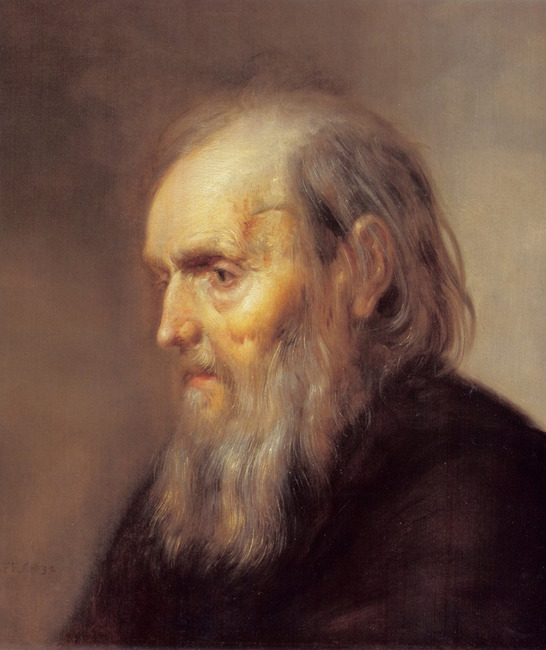
Portrait of an unknown old man

In 1632 he registered a pupil. He was member of a local civil militia (schutterij). He was close to the brothers Frans and Dirck Hals, both like him sons of Flemish parents who had moved to the Dutch Republic. He was likely the Franchoys Elaut who was a witness at the baptism of Frans Hals' son Reinier on 11 February 1627. Elaut and Dirck Hals also jointly organized a lottery in Haarlem.

He died in Haarlem, where he was buried on 22 September 1635. He likely died from the plague which killed many people in Haarlem in the year of his death.

== Work ==
Only very few works from his oeuvre are known and only a few of them are signed (monogrammed) and dated. It was traditionally believed that he was solely a still life painter. It is now confirmed that he also painted merry company paintings and tronies.

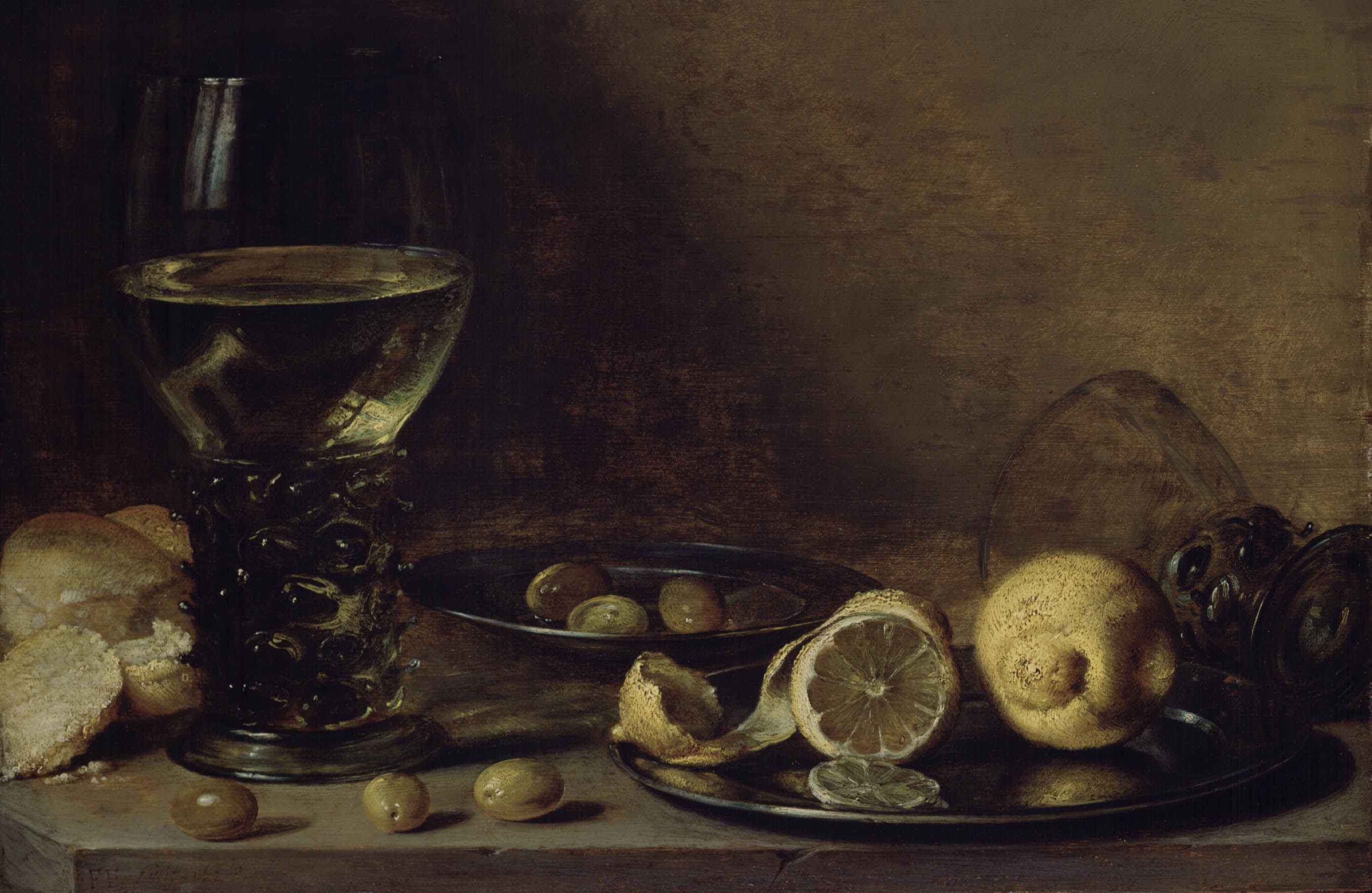
Banquet still life with rummers and lemons

His still lifes are monochrome banquet pieces, i.e. still lifes of foods displayed on a table executed in a muted palette. They are close to the style of Pieter Claesz, the inventor of the monochrome banquet still lifes who also worked in Haarlem. The Still life with a pewter jug, a ham and other objects on a table (monogrammed and dated lower center: FE Fecit Aº 1627, auctioned at Sotheby's New York on 18 October 2000, lot 113) is an example of his banquet pieces. It shows his ability to depict the texture of objects and his interest in rendering the reflections and play of light upon surfaces such as the pewter jug.

Elaut also painted tronies, i.e. works that depict an exaggerated facial expression, certain type of person or people in costume. An example is the Portrait of an unknown old man (monogrammed and dated lower left: F.E. Aº 1632, auctioned at Venduhuis der Notarissen (The Hague) on 3-4 November 1981, lot 199). This work is painted very freely with a thick layer of paint in certain areas, which is similar to the technique he used for his still lifes.

He also painted a number of merry companies showing elegant people enjoying themselves in interiors playing and listening to music. These works are similar to paintings of the same subject by Dirck Hals. It is possible that both artists shared models or that Elaut worked after drawings by Dirck Hals. It cannot be excluded that some works of Elaut in this genre have been wrongly attributed to Hals.
