= Monogrammist H.C. =

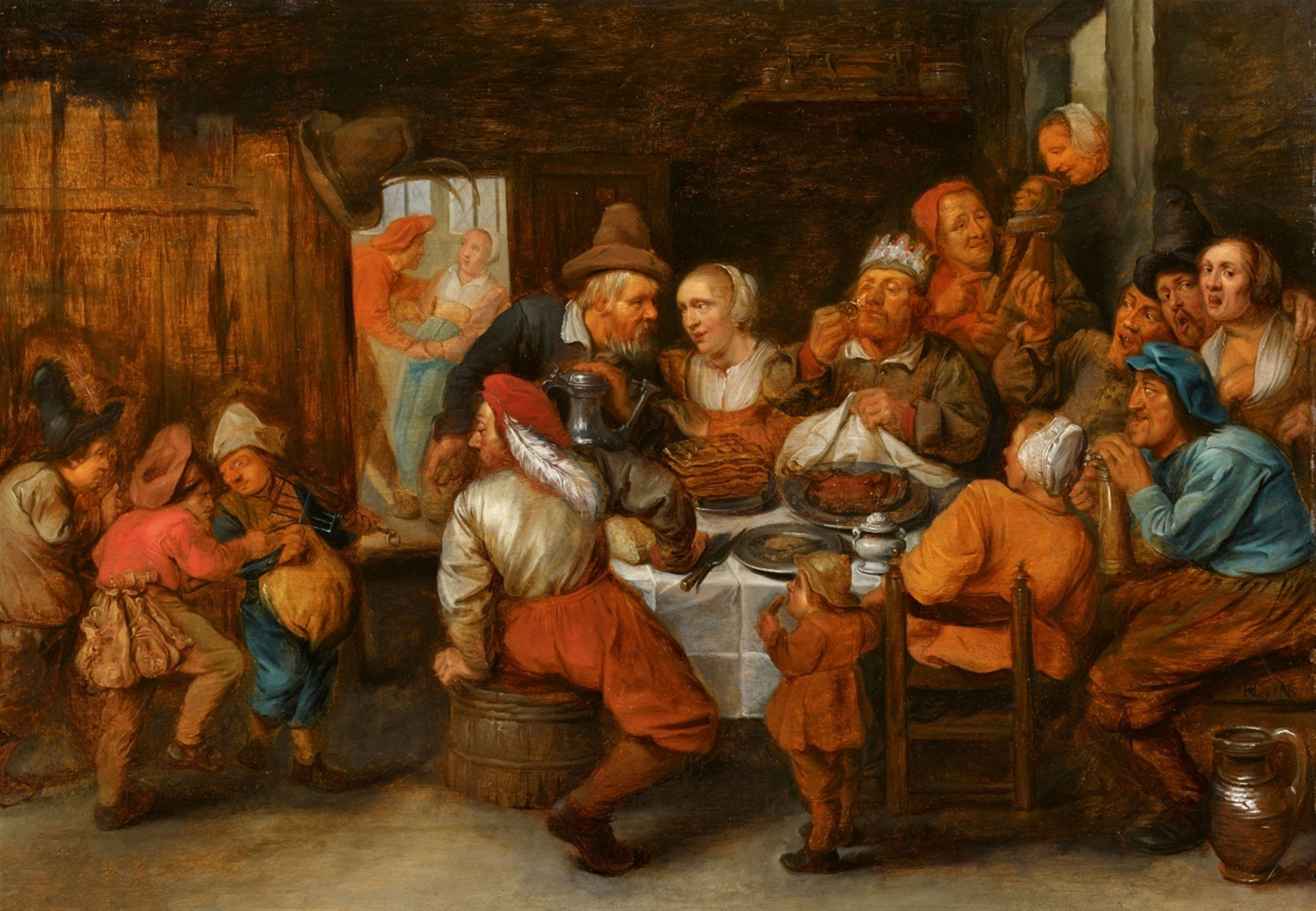
The King drinks

The Monogrammist H.C. was a Flemish genre painter active in the Southern Netherlands in the 17th century. He is known for his scenes with peasants, fortune tellers, merry companies, medical procedures and notary offices.

== Identity of the artist ==
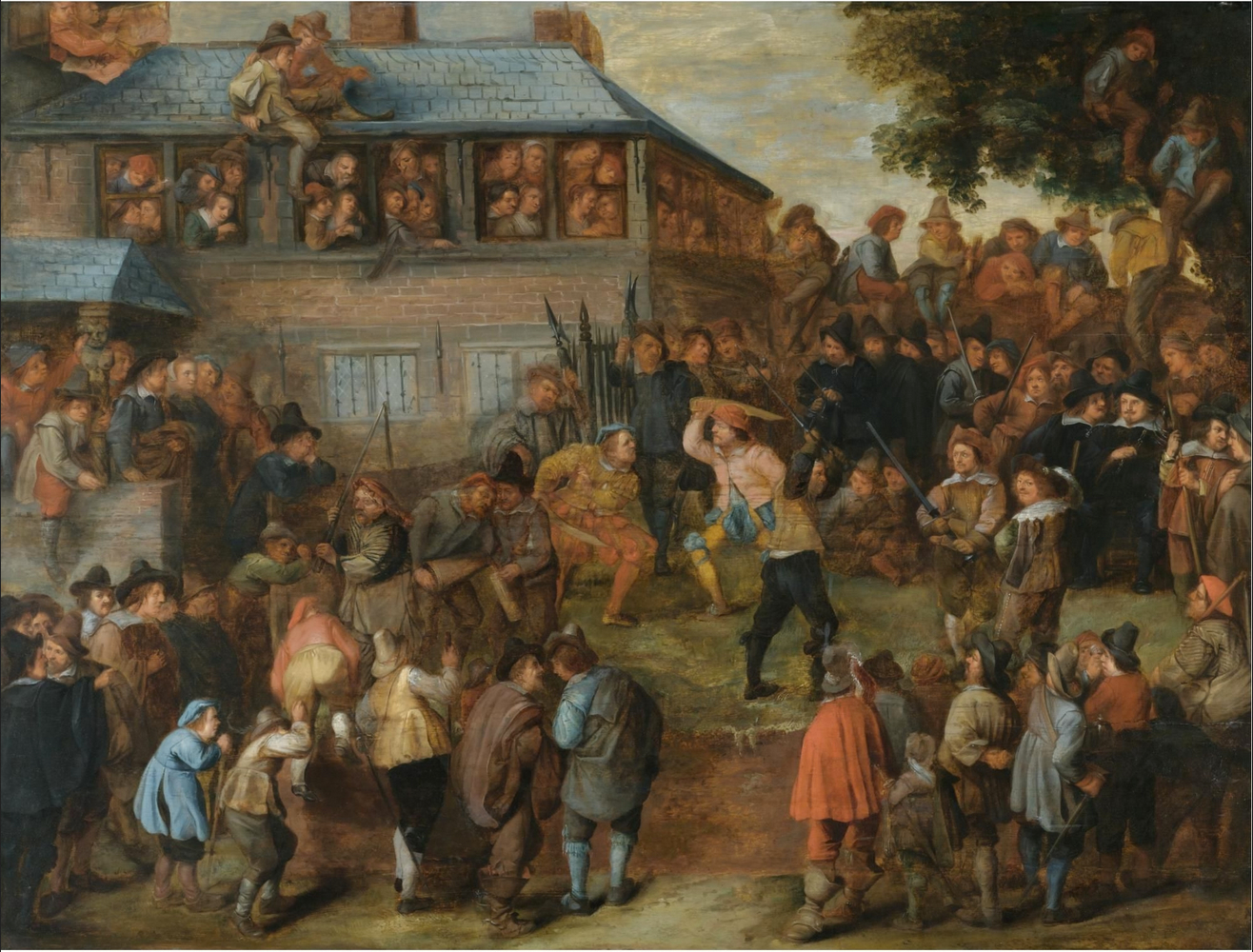
Large crowd with peasants fighting in front of a house

The monogram 'HG' (or 'HC') used to be identified as the signature of the Antwerp artist Willem van Herp. The German biographical dictionary of artists Thieme-Becker grouped a number of works traditionally ascribed to van Herp, which were characterised by figures on a larger scale as the output of an unidentified artist with the same initials as van Herp. Thieme-Becker proposed the notname 'Pseudo Herp' for this artist.

More recently the art historian Fred Meijer identified a number of interior scenes, which were close to van Herp's work and stylistically coherent with them, which he assigned to an artist which he gave the notname 'Monogrammist H.C.'. Among these works were the Violent robbery (Museum Bredius, The Hague) previously attributed to Pieter Codde and subsequently attributed to Anonymous Southern Netherlands. Other works reattributed to the Monogrammist H.C. are The King drinks (Bonhams, London 9 July 2008, lot 83), previously attributed to Wilem van Herp; and the A doctor performing a back operation, watched by country folk (Wellcome Library), previously attributed to Adriaen Rombouts.

The Monogrammist H.C. active in Antwerp should be distinguished from an artist also referred to as Monogrammist H.C. who was active in the Northern Netherlands and was a landscape painter.

== Work ==
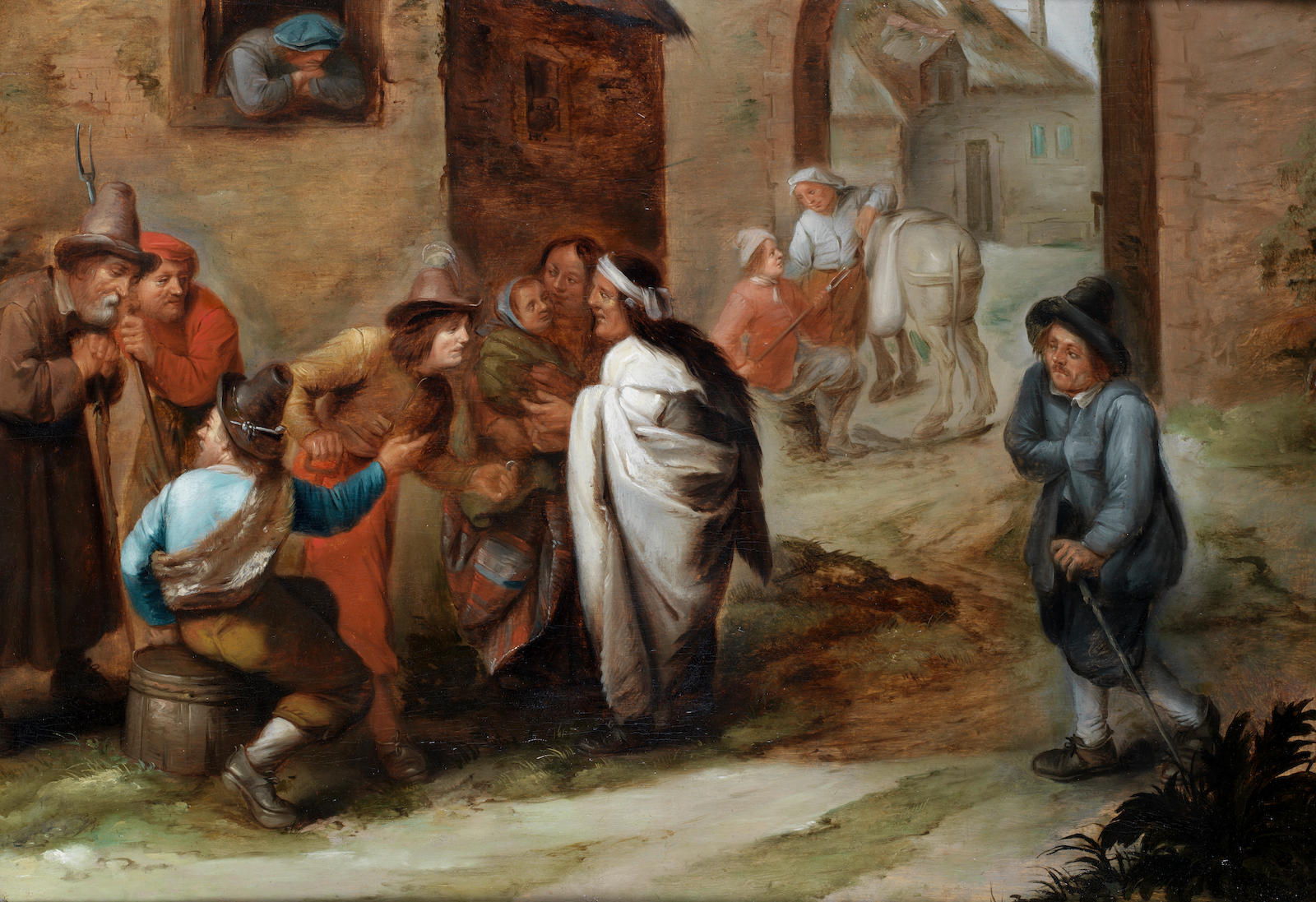
The Fortune Teller

The Monogrammist H.C was a genre painter. He painted scenes with peasants at play and drinking, fortune tellers, merry companies, medical procedures and notary offices.
