= The Smokers (painting) =

Painting by Adriaen Brouwer

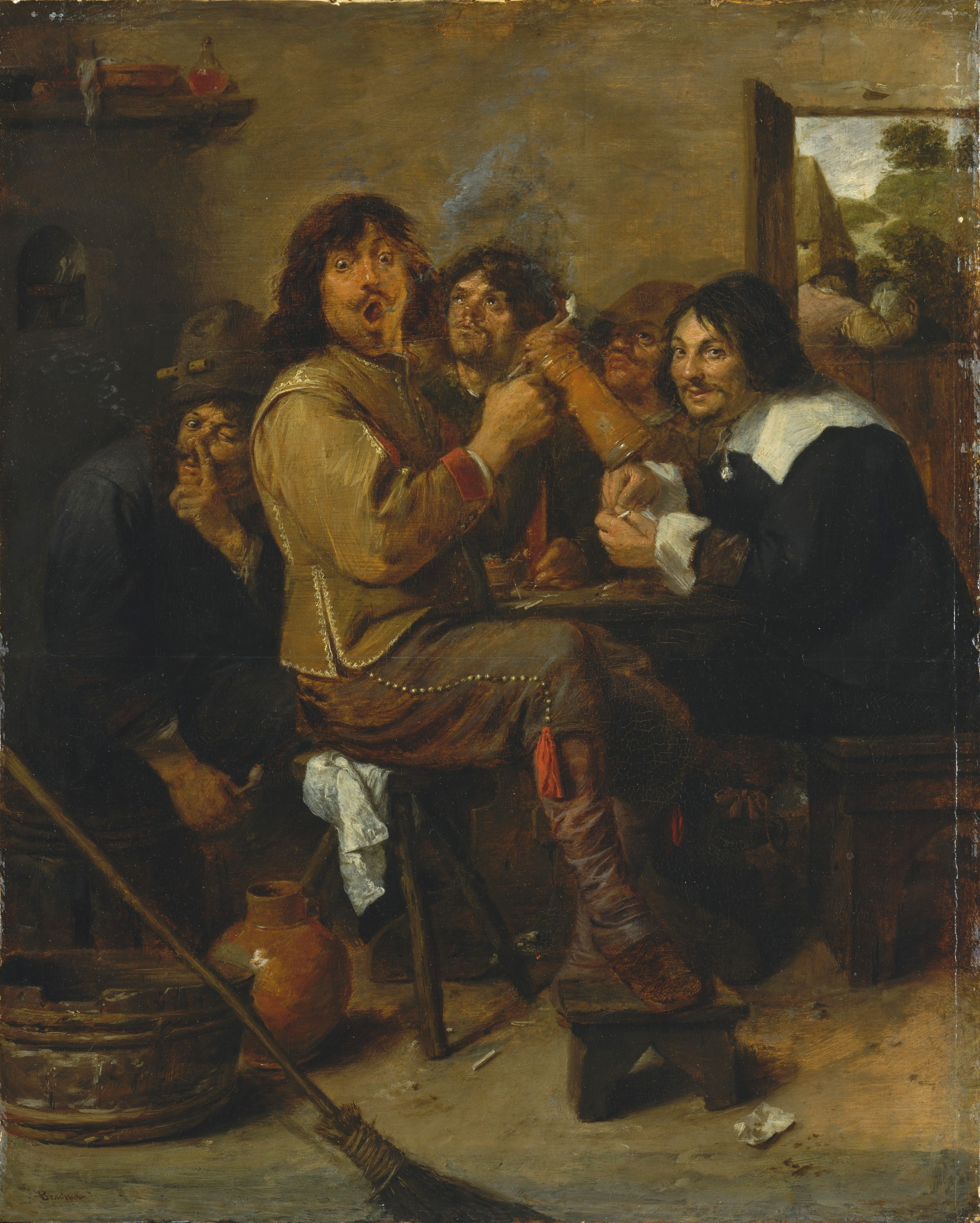
The Smokers (c. 1636) by Adriaen Brouwer

The Smokers is a painting by the Flemish painter Adriaen Brouwer, painted in about 1636, probably in Antwerp. It hangs in the Metropolitan Museum of Art, in New York.

The oil-on-wood painting measures 46.40 by 36.80 centimetres (18.27 in × 14.49 in) and is signed by the artist.

== Description ==
The painting is of five young men smoking pipes and drinking beer. At the time, smoking was new and controversial. Brouwer included a self-portrait: he is the one turning to face the viewer while lifting a drinking mug and exhaling smoke. While the subjects have not been identified with certainty, it has been suggested the person in black and white apparel depicted on the right is painter Jan de Heem; the person in the middle is Joos van Craesbeeck; the person depicted blowing smoke out of his nose is painter Jan Cossiers; and Jan Lievens is the person on the far left.
