= Adriaen Brouwer =

Flemish painter (c. 1605 – 1638)

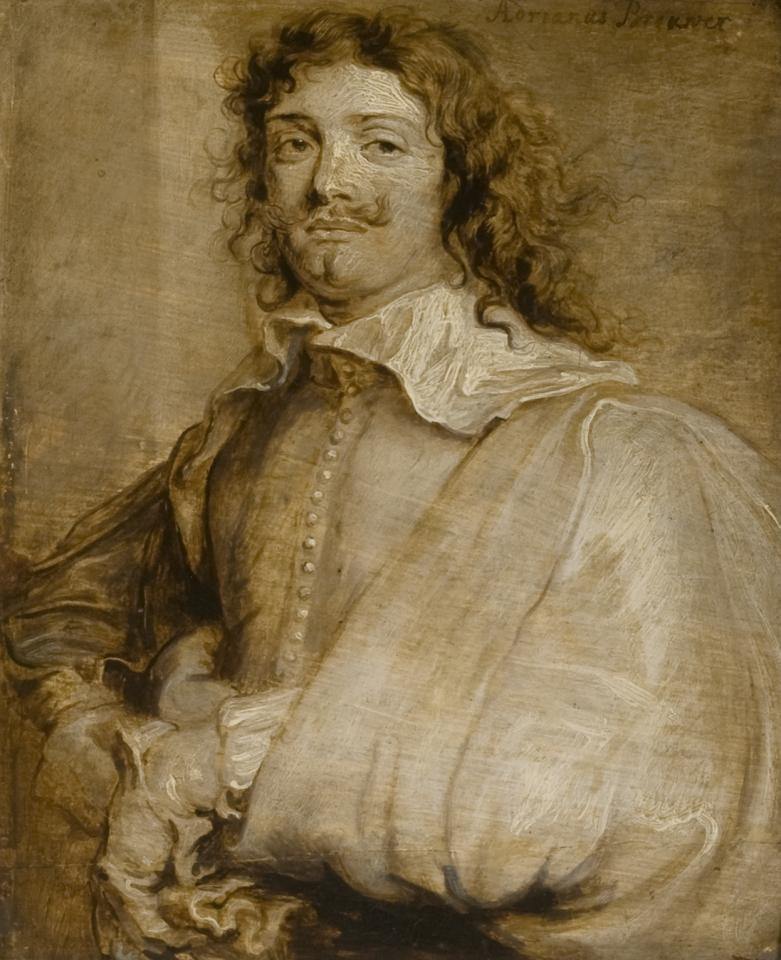
- Adriaen Brouwer, a c. 1631 portrait by Anthony van Dyck
- Born: c. 1605/1606; Oudenaarde, Spanish Netherlands
- Died: January 1638 (aged 31-33); Antwerp, Spanish Netherlands
- Known for: Painting
- Movement: Baroque

Adriaen Brouwer (c. 1605 – January 1638) was a Flemish painter active in Flanders and the Dutch Republic in the first half of the 17th century. Brouwer was an important innovator of genre painting through his vivid depictions of peasants, soldiers and other "lower class" individuals engaged in drinking, smoking, card or dice playing, fighting, music making etc. in taverns or rural settings. Brouwer contributed to the development of the genre of tronies, i.e. head or facial studies, which investigate varieties of expression. In his final year he produced a few landscapes of a tragic intensity. Brouwer's work had an important influence on the next generation of Flemish and Dutch genre painters. Although Brouwer produced only a small body of work, Dutch masters Peter Paul Rubens and Rembrandt collected it.

== Life ==
There are still a number of unresolved questions surrounding the early life and career of Adriaen Brouwer. The early Dutch biographer Arnold Houbraken included multiple erroneous statements and fanciful stories about Brouwer in his The Great Theatre of Dutch Painters of 1718–19. The most glaring mistakes of Houbraken were to place Brouwer's place of birth in Haarlem in the Dutch Republic and to identify Frans Hals as his master.

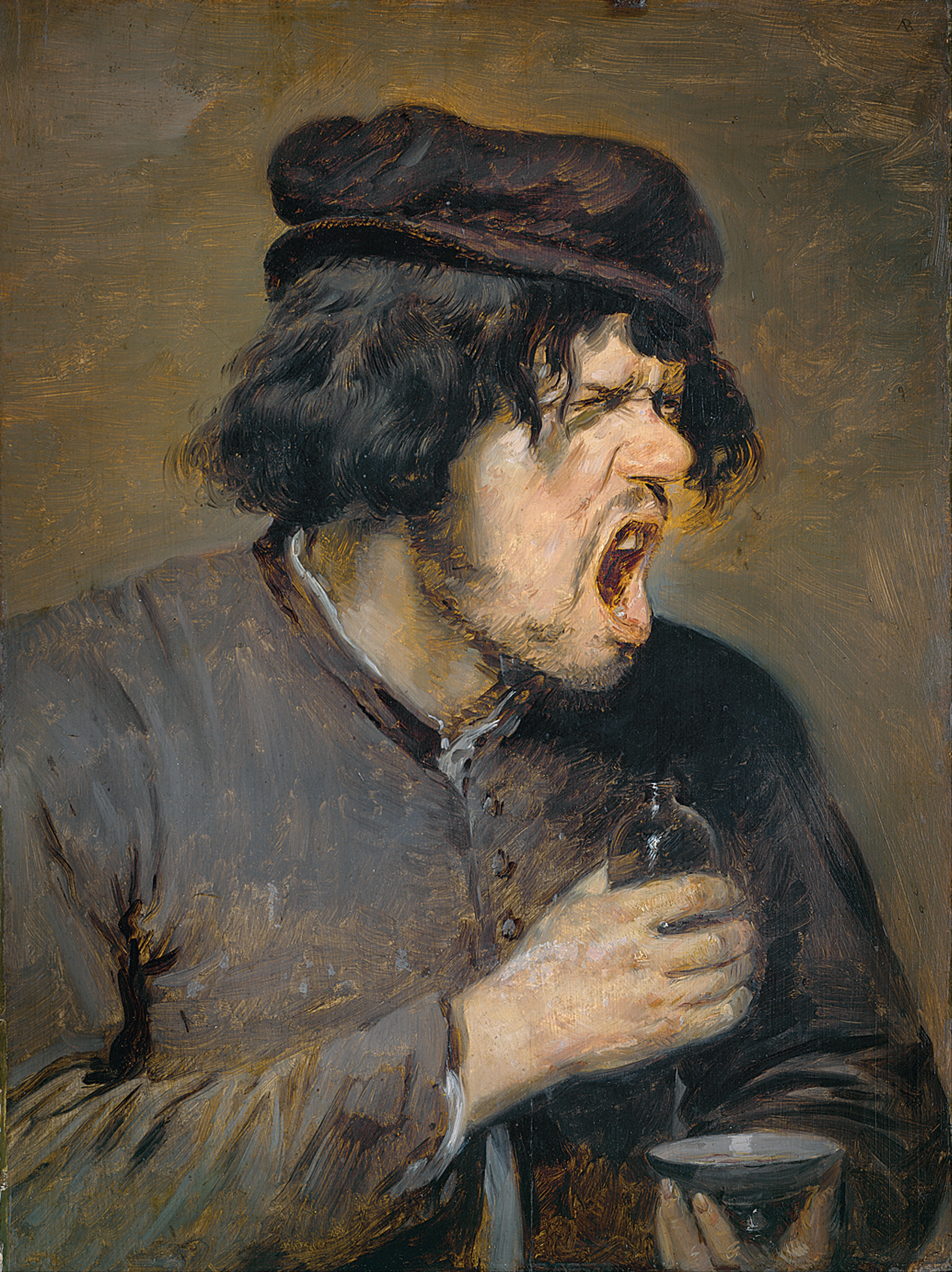
The Bitter Draught (1636–1638), Städelsches Kunstinstitut, Frankfurt

It is now generally accepted that Brouwer was born in Oudenaarde in Flanders in 1605 or 1606. His father who was also called Adriaen worked as a tapestry designer in Oudenaarde, at the time an important centre for tapestry production in Flanders. The father died in poverty when Adriaen the younger was only 15 or 16 years old. Brouwer had by that time already left the paternal home.

Brouwer worked in Antwerp in 1622. By March 1625 Adriaen Brouwer was recorded in Amsterdam where he resided in the inn of the painter Barend van Someren, another Flemish artist who had taken up residence in the Dutch Republic. Brouwer is further recorded on 23 July 1626 as a notary's witness when he signed a statement of Barend van Someren and Adriaen van Nieulandt about a sale of pictures in Amsterdam. It is possible that by that time he already lived in Haarlem. He was active in the Chamber of Rhetoric 'De Wijngaertranken' in Haarlem. The motto of this amateur literary circle was: "In Love Above All Else".

In 1631 Brouwer returned to his native Flanders where he was registered as a master in the Antwerp Guild of St Luke even before he had become a poorter of Antwerp. The artist continued to live and work in Antwerp until his untimely death. The artist's name regularly shows up in Antwerp records usually in connection with arrangements for his various debts.

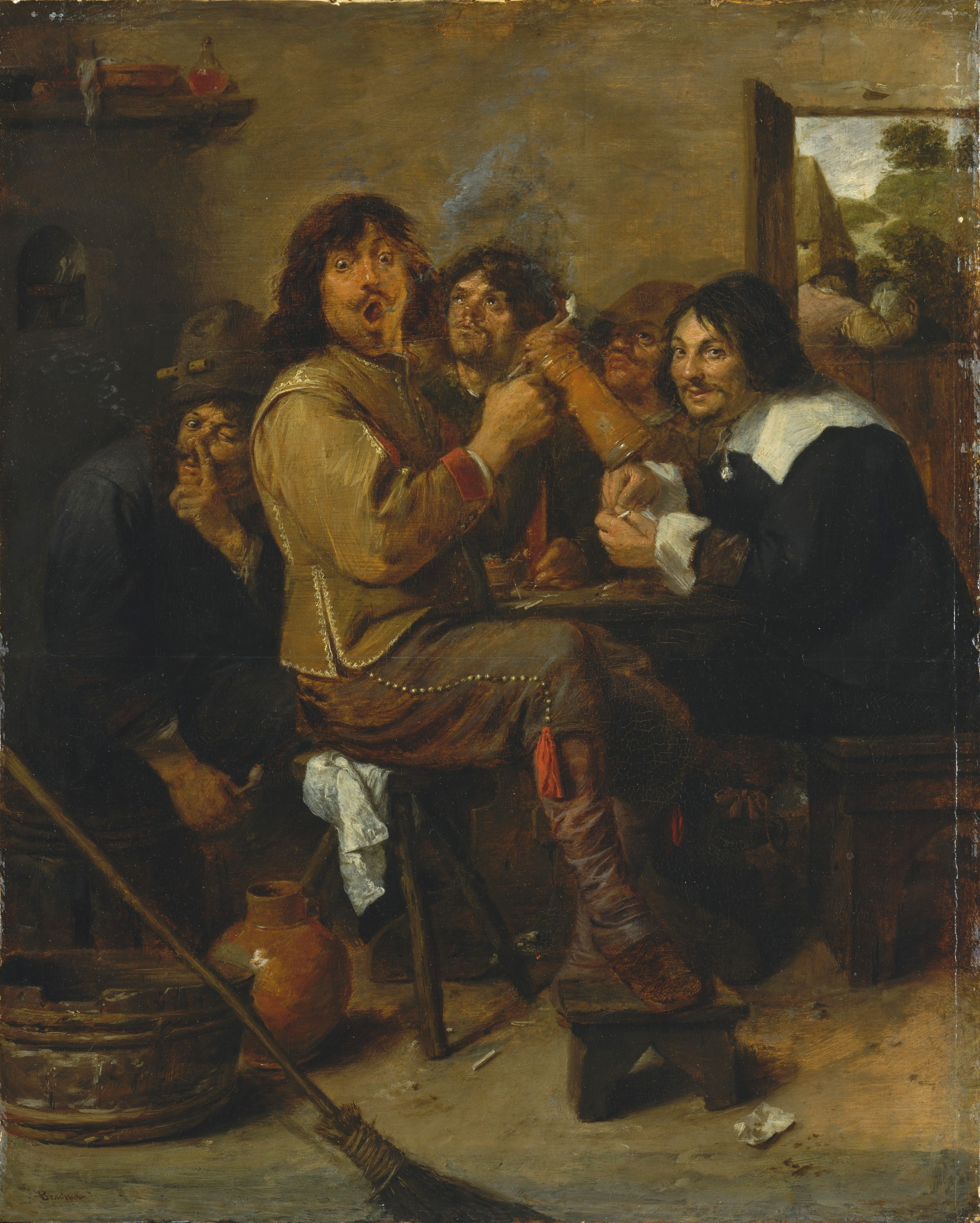
The Smokers (1636) Metropolitan Museum of Art, New York

In 1633 Brouwer was jailed in the Antwerp Citadel. The reason for the imprisonment is not clear. Possibly it was for tax evasion, or, alternatively, for political reasons because the local authorities may have considered him to be a spy for the Dutch Republic. The operation of the bakery in the Antwerp Citadel was in the hands of the baker Joos van Craesbeeck. It is assumed that Brouwer and van Craesbeeck got to know each other during this time. Based on information provided by contemporary Flemish biographer Cornelis de Bie in his book Het Gulden Cabinet van Craesbeeck is believed to have become Brouwer's pupil and best friend. Their relationship was described by de Bie as "Soo d'oude songhen, soo pypen de jonghen" ("As the old ones sang, so the young ones chirp"). The stylistic similarities of van Craesbeeck's early work with that of Brouwer seem to corroborate such pupilage.

On 26 April 1634 Adriaen Brouwer took up lodgings in the house of the prominent engraver Paulus Pontius as the two men had become close friends. The same year the pair joined the local chamber of rhetoric Violieren. It has been suggested that Brouwer's painting called Fat Man or Luxuria (Mauritshuis), which possibly represents the deadly sin of lust, is at the same time a portrait of Paulus Pontius.

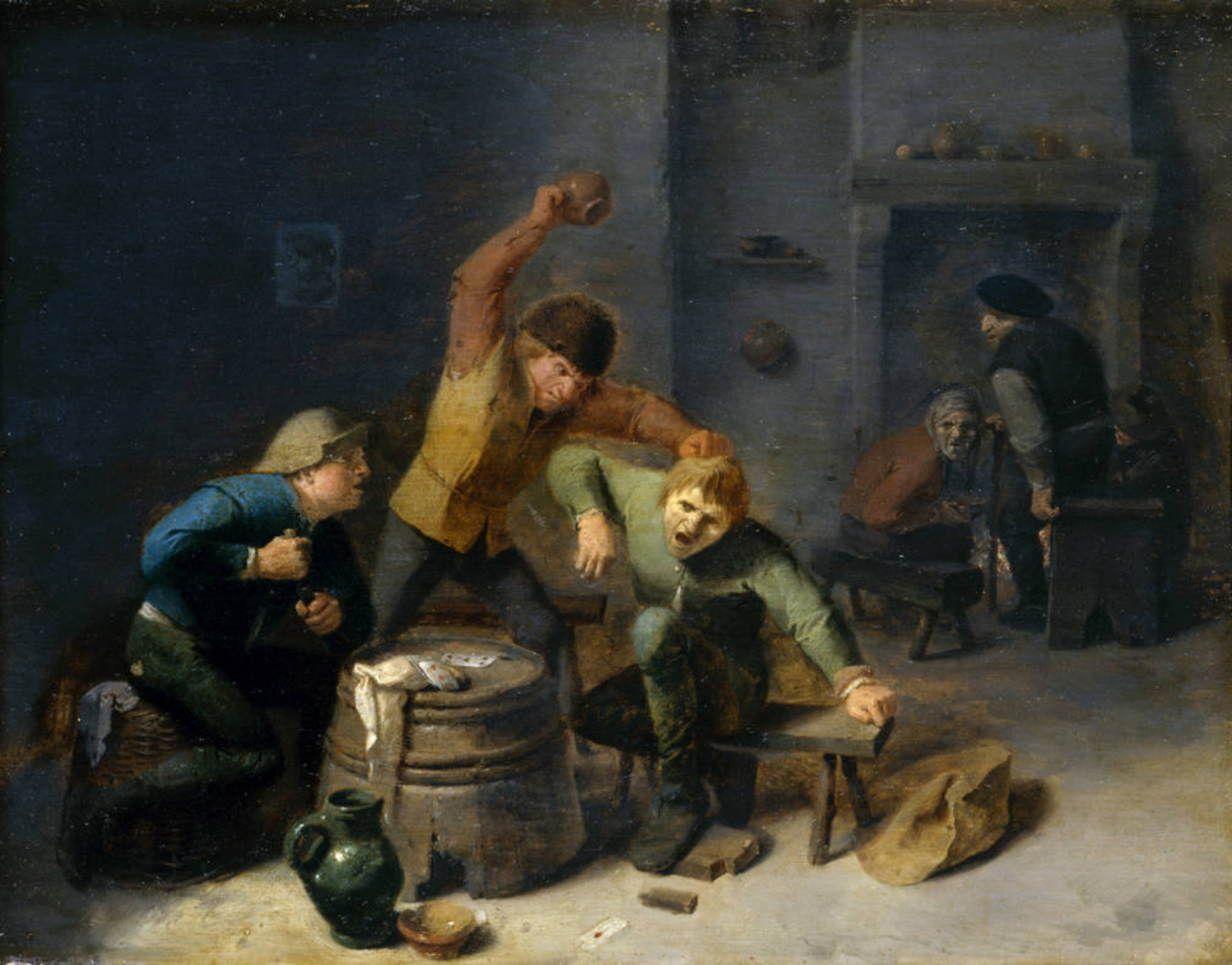
Peasants Brawling Over Cards, ca. 1632–1635. Alte Pinakothek, Munich

Early biographers describe how Adriaen Brouwer and his artist friends spent much of their time in local taverns. Brouwer painted a tavern scene called The Smokers, which included a self-portrait together with portraits of Jan Cossiers, Jan Lievens, Joos van Craesbeeck and Jan Davidsz. de Heem (c. 1636, Metropolitan Museum of Art, New York). The company of friends is shown sitting around a table and smoking. Brouwer is the figure in the middle who is turned around to face the viewer. This type of group portrait doubled as a representation of one of the five senses (in this case the sense of taste).

Despite his reported dissolute lifestyle and his preference for low-life subjects, Brouwer was highly respected by his colleagues as evidenced by the fact that Rubens owned 17 works by Brouwer at the time of his death, of which at least one had been acquired before Rubens got to know Brouwer personally. Rembrandt and Titus van Rijn also had paintings by Brouwer in his collection.

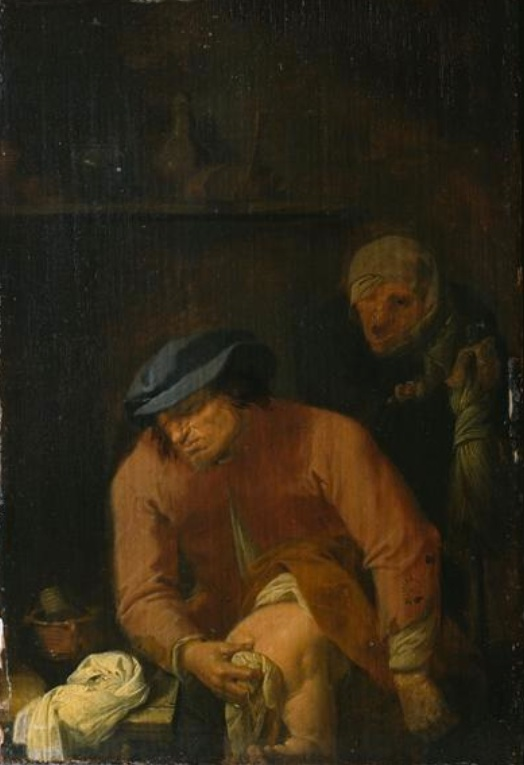
Smell. Staatliche Kunstsammlungen Dresden

In 1635 Brouwer took on Jan-Baptist Dandoy (active 1631–1638) as his only officially registered pupil. In January 1638 Adriaen Brouwer died in Antwerp. Some early biographers associated his early death with his party lifestyle and abuse of alcohol. Houbraken, however, attributes his death to the plague. Evidence for the latter is that originally his remains were buried in a common grave. A month after his death on 1 February 1638, his body was re-interred in the Carmelite Church of Antwerp after a solemn ceremony, at the initiative and expense and in the presence of his artist friends.

== Work ==
=== General ===
Brouwer left a small body of work amounting to about 60 works. Just a few of his works are signed, while none is dated. As Brouwer was widely copied, imitated and followed in his time, attributions of work to Brouwer are sometimes uncertain or contested. For instance, The Smoker (Louvre) showing a man exhaling smoke while holding a bottle of liquor was attributed for a long time to Brouwer, but is now given to Brouwer's follower and, possibly, pupil Joos van Craesbeeck.

The principal subject matter of Brouwer are genre scenes with peasants, soldiers and other "lower class" individuals engaging in drinking, smoking, card or dice playing, fights etc. often set in taverns or rural settings. Brouwer also contributed to the development of the genre of tronies, i.e. head or facial studies, which investigate varieties of expression. He produced a few landscapes in the final years of his career. Brouwer's compositions are nearly all executed in small format.

Brouwer was influenced by Dirck Hals, a genre painter who was active in Haarlem. Brouwer's stylistic development cannot be traced with certainty. Pictures in bright natural colours are believed to have been painted in the 1620s. Around 1630, Brouwer's palette started showing a strong preference for browns, greys and greens. The painter had a free, sketchy manner of painting and applied paint thinly.

=== Genre scenes ===
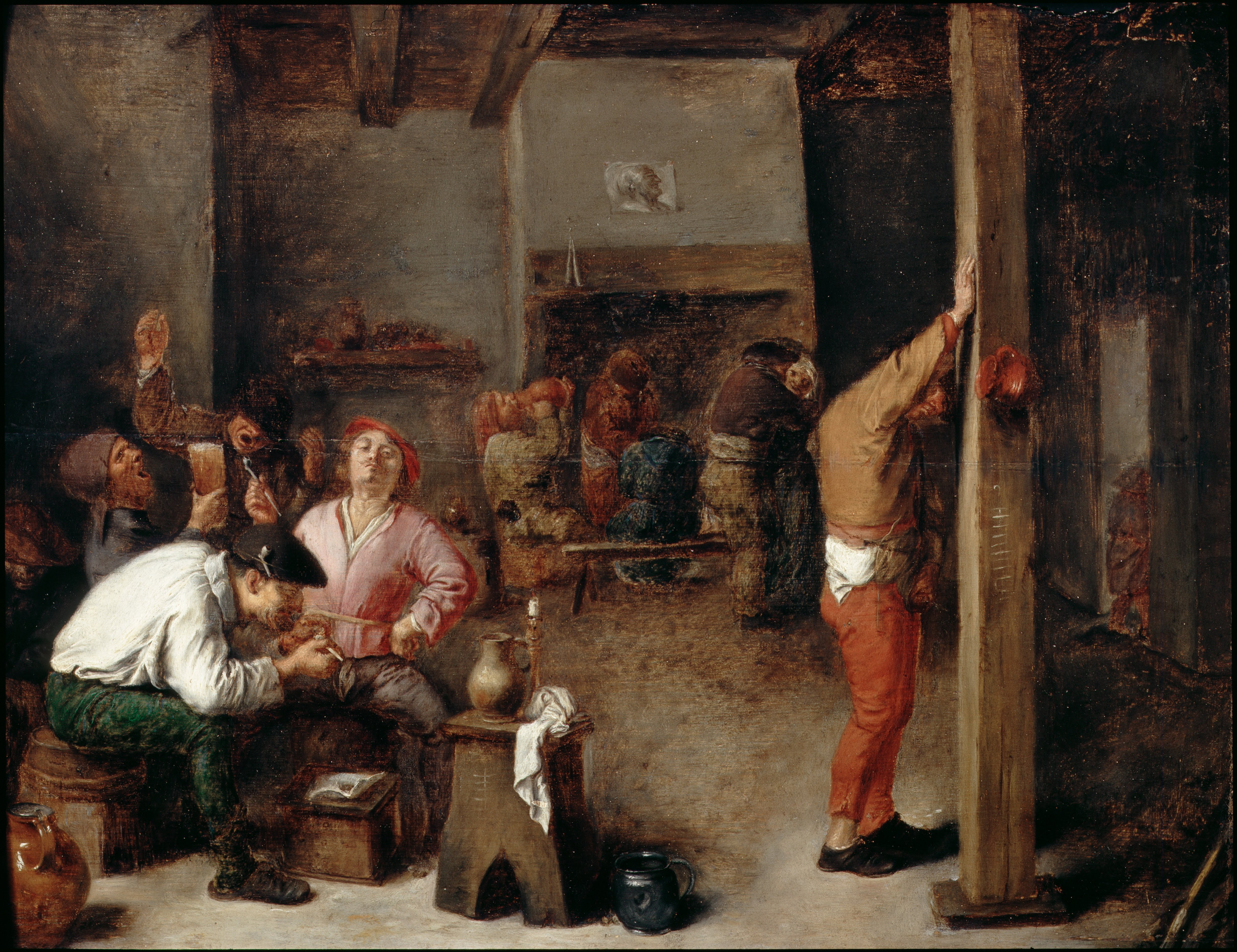
Interior of a Tavern, Dulwich Picture Gallery, South London

In his genre scenes Brouwer depicted peasants, soldiers and other "lower class" individuals engaging in various forms of vices such as drinking, smoking, card or dice playing, brawls etc. often set in taverns or rural settings. The sole purpose of his compositions often appears to be the representation of the essence of the vice.

It is still contested whether he intended to convey any moral message. He gradually appears to have concentrated more on the expressions of his subjects going through the emotions of pain, anger, disgust and joy. This is particularly clear in his many paintings of tavern brawls, such as the Brawl Between Peasants and Brawling Card Players (both in the Alte Pinakothek, Munich). These compositions depict how rage in its varying stages and degrees is reflected in the facial expressions of the persons having an argument. Brouwer does not appear to denounce these outbreaks of anger as a Christian sin but as an expression of a lack of self-control. This view may have come from ethical ideas of Seneca the Younger that were formulated as neostoicism by Justus Lipsius, and generally accepted in Antwerp's humanist circle of which Brouwer formed part.

=== Portraits and tronies ===
Adriaen Brouwer is regarded as an important innovator of portrait painting, a prominent genre in Netherlandish art.

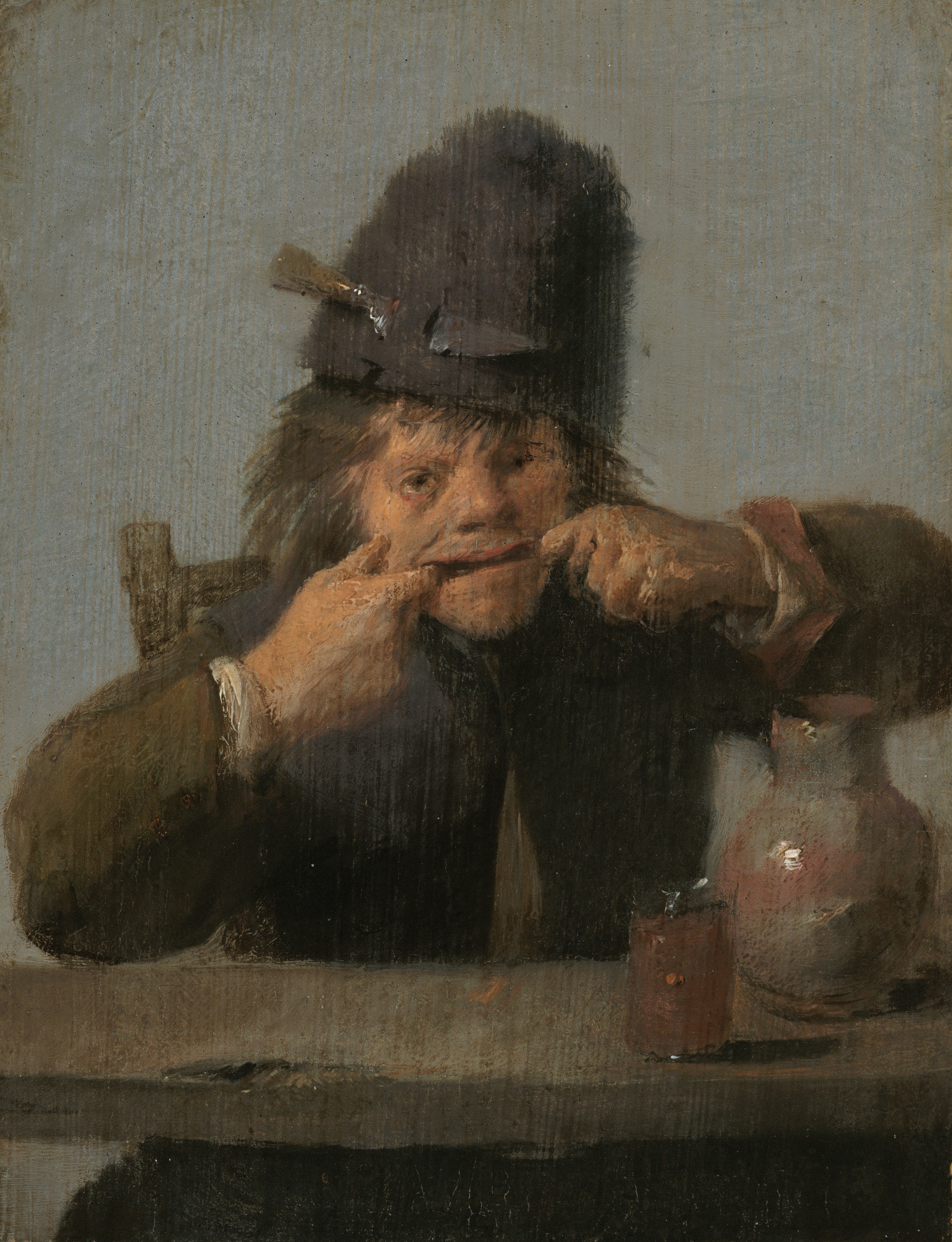
Youth Making a Face

His most famous group portrait is set in a tavern and is referred to as The Smokers (c. 1636, The Metropolitan Museum of Art, in New York City). Despite the modern title, the scene is a group portrait of fellow artists of Adriaen Brouwer who resided in Antwerp. Not all of them have been identified with certainty. Brouwer is the second figure on the left who is turned towards the viewer. He has his eyes wide open, holds a beer jug in his right hand and puffs out smoke from his pipe. The figure on the far right has been identified as Jan Davidsz. de Heem. The other artists have not been identified with certainty but it has been suggested that Jan Lievens is the person on the far left, Joos van Craesbeeck the person in the middle and Jan Cossiers the second person on the right. This group portrait is regarded as belonging to the type of the "friendship portrait". Similar friendship portraits that include a self-portrait had been created before by Rubens in his Self-Portrait in a Circle of Friends from Mantua and by Simon de Vos in the group portrait of himself with Johan Geerlof and Jan Cossiers referred to as Gathering of Smokers and Drinkers. While the latter two friendship portraits were fairly conventional, Brouwer innovated the type in The Smokers. He achieved this by expanding the portraits to full-length portraits, setting the scene in a tavern, the expressiveness of the faces and the nonchalant demeanour and clothing of the sitters. The dynamism of the composition brings the group portrait closer to Brouwer's tavern scenes than to contemporary portrait paintings. The portrait The Smokers falls also into the genre of the "dissolute" artist portraits that took root in Dutch and Flemish genre painting in the 17th century. The genre was an inversion of the Renaissance ideal of the "pictor doctus": the artist as an intellectual and gentleman. This ideal was replaced by the new model of the prodigal artist who is characterized by his creative inspiration and talents. These (self-)portraits emphasized the artists' dissolute nature by creating associations with traditional moral themes such as the Five Senses, the Seven Deadly Sins and the Prodigal Son in the Tavern. In The Smokers Bouwers depicted the sense of taste.

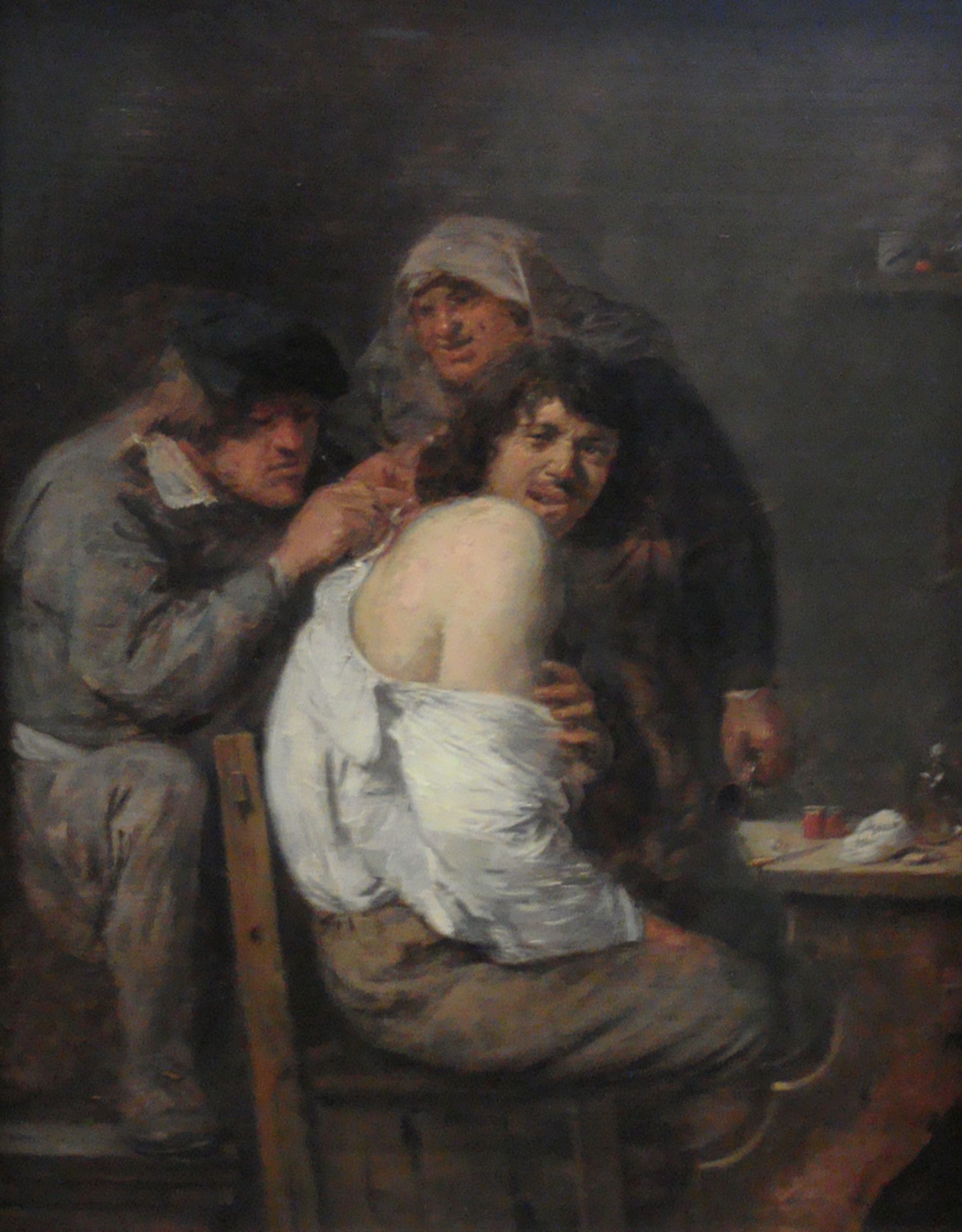
The Back Operation

Brouwer played an important role in the development of the genre of the tronie. The term tronie typically refers to figure studies not intended to depict an identifiable person, but rather to investigate varieties of expression. As such tronies are a form of genre painting in a portrait format. Adriaen Brouwer contributed to the genre as he had a talent for expressiveness. His work gave a face to lower-class figures by infusing their images with recognizable and vividly expressed human emotions—anger, joy, pain, and pleasure. His Youth Making a Face (c. 1632/1635, National Gallery of Art) shows a young man with a satirical and mocking gesture which humanises him, however uninviting he may appear. Brouwer's vigorous application of paint in this composition, with his characteristically short, unmodulated brushstrokes, increases the dramatic effect.

Genre painters often returned to the old theme of the allegory of the five senses and created series of tronies depicting the five senses or the seven deadly sins. Brouwer also painted a number of genre portraits that represent the five senses or the seven deadly sins. An example is the painting called Fat Man or Luxuria (Mauritshuis), which is believed to be a portrait of Paulus Pontius as well as a representation of the deadly sin of lust (luxuria in Latin).

=== Landscapes ===
Brouwer painted a few late landscapes in addition to his rural scenes. They are atmospheric and painted with a loose touch. These landscapes were influential on other landscape painters such as Lodewijk de Vadder whose Extensive Dune Landscape With Travelers and a Dog On a Path Alongside an Inlet clearly draws inspiration from Brouwer's Dune Landscape by Moonlight (Gemäldegalerie, Berlin).

== Influence ==
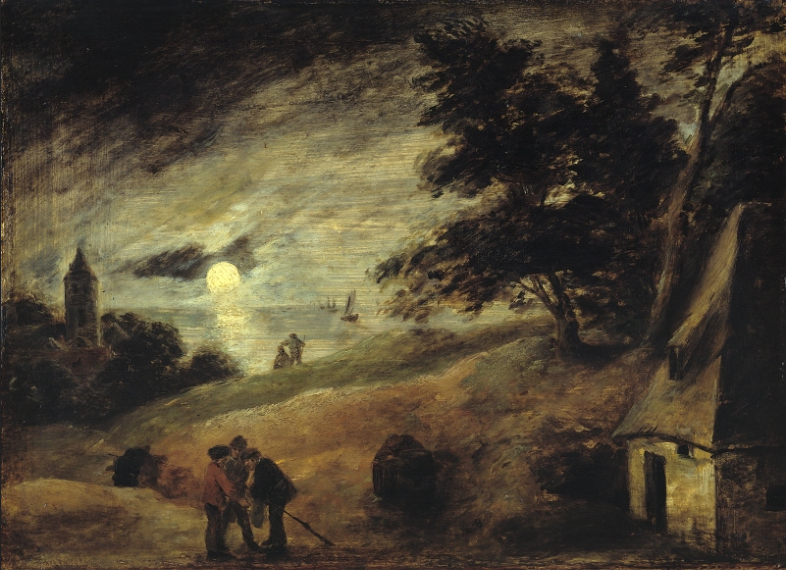
Dune Landscape by Moonlight

Brouwer influenced a large number of Flemish and Dutch painters including Adriaen van Ostade and his brother Isak, Cornelis Saftleven, David Teniers the Younger, Joos van Craesbeeck, David Ryckaert, Gillis van Tilborch, Mattheus van Helmont, Hendrik Martenszoon Sorgh, Horatius Bollongier, Giacomo Francesco Cipper, Daniël Boone and Joseph Danhauser.

== In literature ==
In Fisher's Drawing Room Scrap Book, 1837, Letitia Elizabeth Landon published a poem entitled "A Dutch Interior" based on Brouwer's painting Peasants playing cards in an Inn.
