= Zeger Jacob van Helmont =

(1683–1726) Flemish painter and tapestry designer working in Brussels

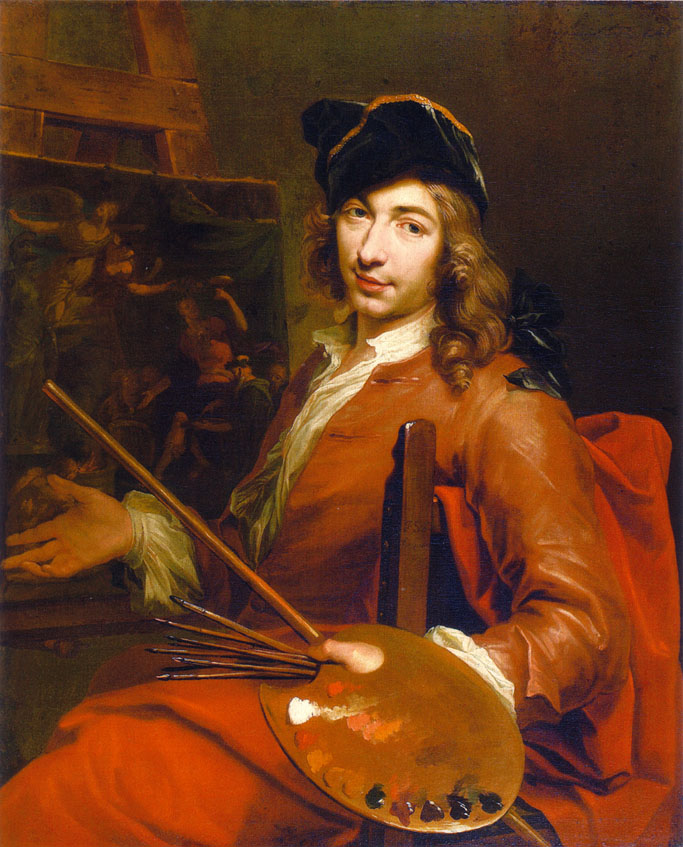
Self-portrait

Zeger Jacob van Helmont (1683 in Antwerp – 1726 in Brussels), was a Flemish painter and tapestry designer who specialized in portraits and history paintings. He trained with his father in Antwerp but spent his active career in Brussels where he worked for the local churches and tapestry workshops.

== Life ==
Zeger Jacob van Helmont was born in Antwerp as the son of the history and portrait painter Jan van Helmont and Isabella le Rousseau. He trained with his father but did not join the local Guild of Saint Luke in Antwerp. Instead, in 1711, he moved to Brussels, the capital of the Spanish Netherlands and the location of the court. In Brussels he joined the local Guild of Saint Luke hoping to find a ready market for his work.

As the result of the 1695 Bombardment of Brussels by French troops many churches, guilds and the local authorities ordered new artworks to replace those destroyed during the bombardment. Van Helmont secured numerous commissions. He also found employment designing cartoons for the local tapestry works.

He died in Brussels.

== Work ==
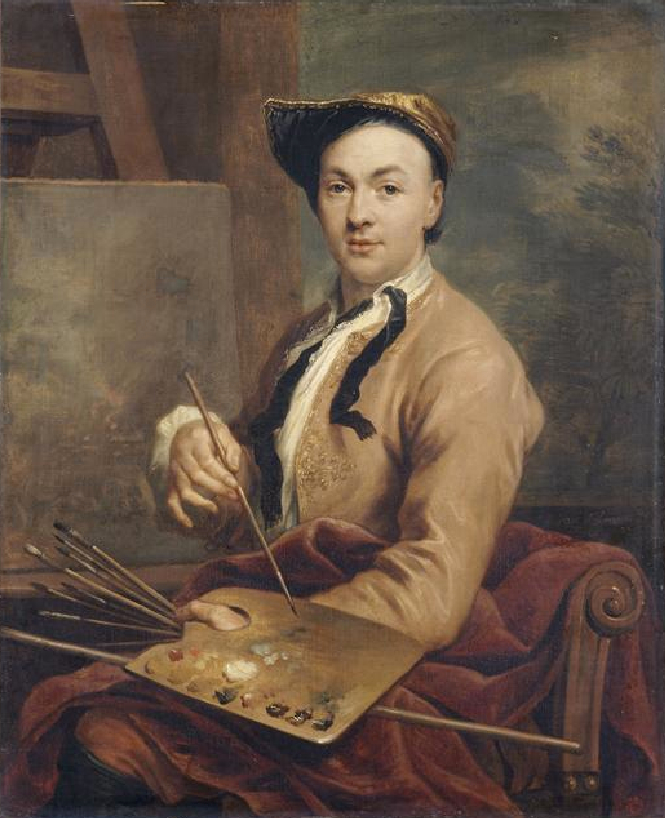
Portrait of Jacques Ignatius de Roore

He is known for paintings and tapestry designs of historical allegories, religious compositions and portraits painted in a Classicist style. He painted several portraits, which were engraved, such as the Portrait of Bruno van der Dussen, regent of Gouda, which was engraved by Bernard Picart. He also painted a portrait of his fellow painter Jacques Ignatius de Roore (1712, Musée des beaux-arts de Valenciennes).

He created various religious works for the Brussels churches.

Van Helmont made cartoons for the Brussels workshops. The Leyniers workshop ordered a series of cartoons on Ovid's Metamorphoses and van Helmont copied works of the French artist Charles de La Fosse for this commission. He also made a series of scenes of country life 'after Teniers' together with the landscape painter Augustin Coppens.
