= Mattheus van Helmont =

Flemish painter

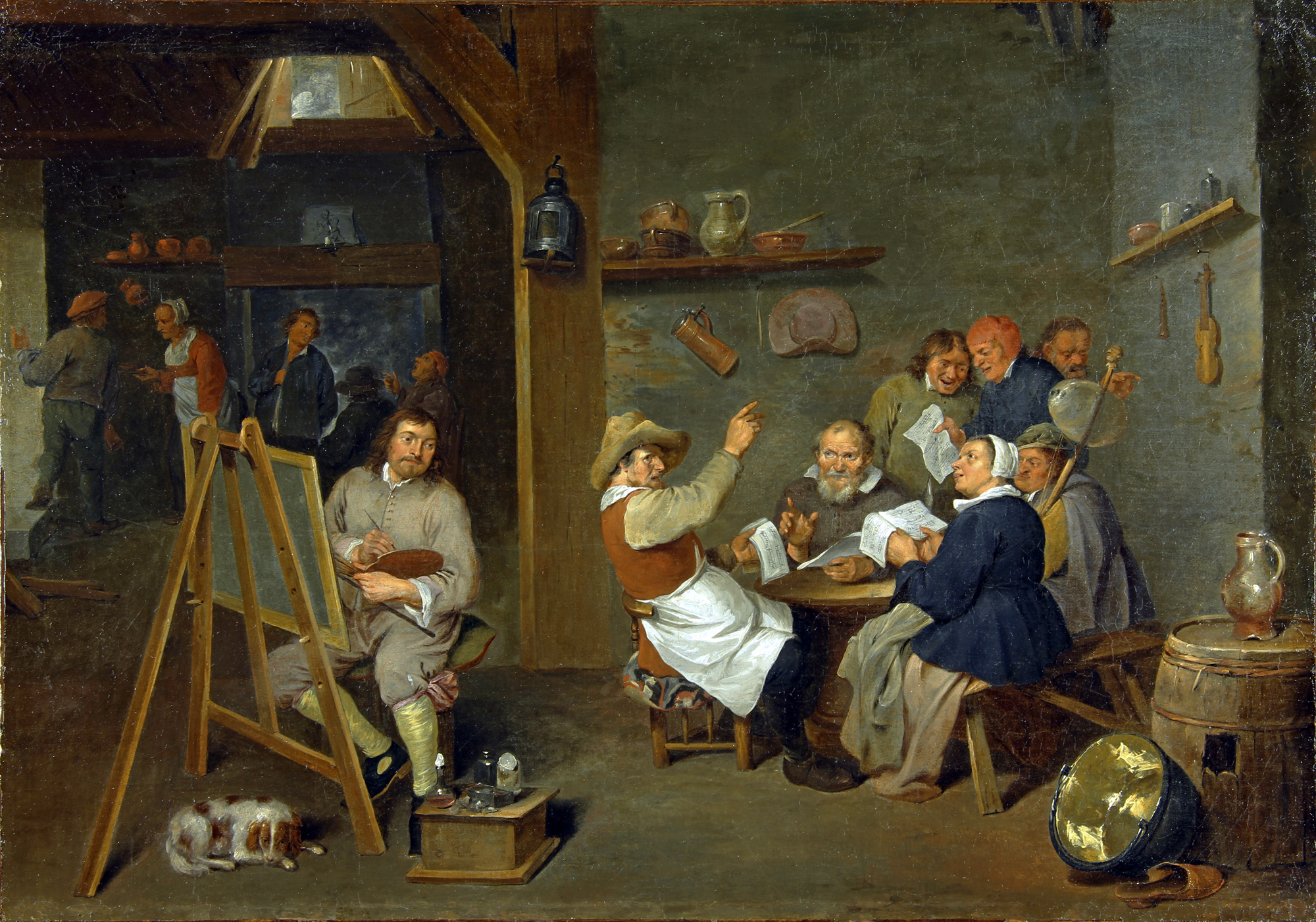
Self-portrait of an artist among a merry, drinking company of peasants in a tavern

Mattheus van Helmont (1623 – after 1679) was a Flemish painter specialized in genre scenes of interiors and village scenes. His style and subject matter were influenced by the work of David Teniers the Younger and Adriaen Brouwer. His preferred subjects were peasant feasts, wedding celebrations, drinkers and alchemists. He developed his own personal style towards the final phase of his career. He spent most of his active life in Antwerp but moved to Brussels later.

== Life ==
Mattheus van Helmont was born in Antwerp as the son of Mattheus van Helmont and Elisabeth Cremers. He was baptised in the Cathedral of Antwerp on 24 July 1623. Mattheus first joined the Antwerp Guild of Saint Luke as the son of a master and in 1645 he became a full master in the Guild.

His paintings of Italianizing market scenes and fairs suggest that he possibly visited Italy but there is no documentary evidence to corroborate such trip. He joined the Brussels Guild of Saint Luke in 1674. On 17 August 1647 he married Margaratha Verstock. The couple had four sons, of whom two – Jan and Gaspard – trained with their father and became painters. Jan became a portrait painter. Gaspard entered the Antwerp Guild in 1679 as a portrait painter but did not leave any known work. The family lived in the Lange Nieuwstraat in Antwerp.

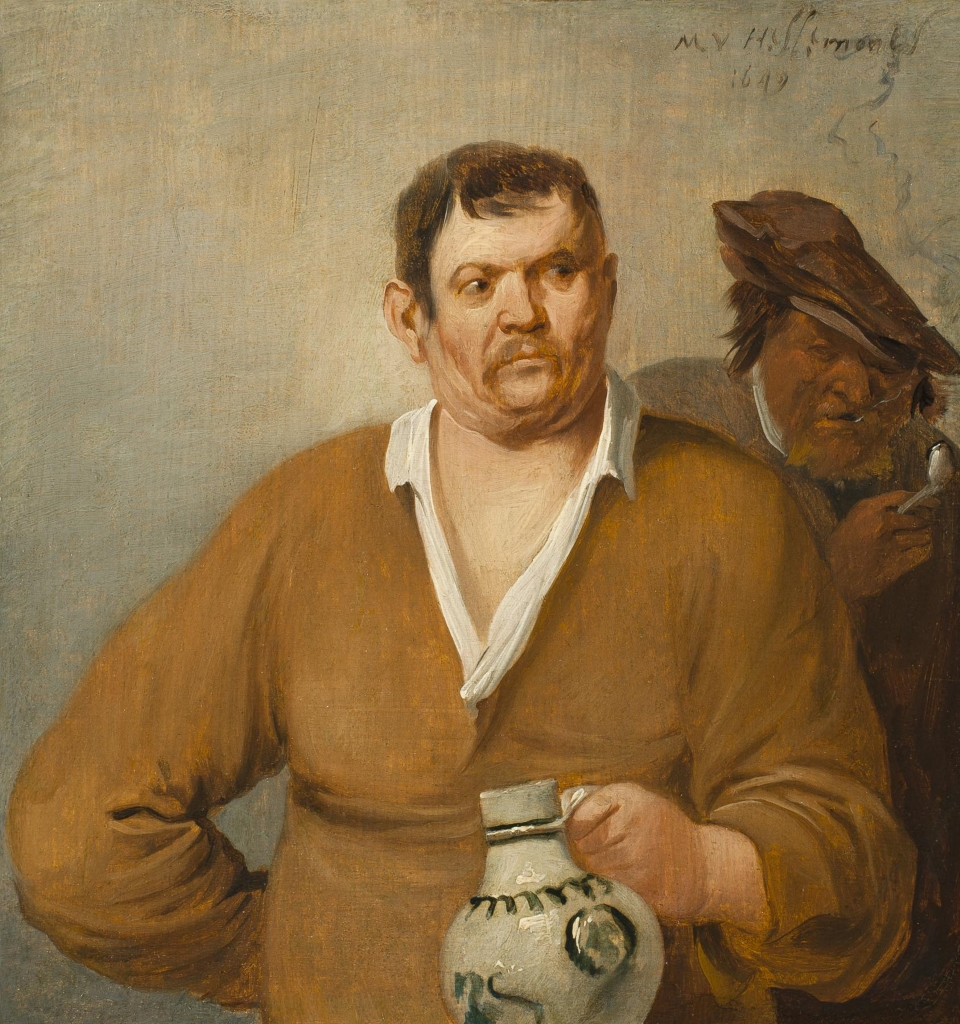
Drinker with a stoneware pitcher and a smoker with a pipe

He had a large output but got into debt, supposedly due to his unruly character and frequent involvement in brawls. This caused him to leave Antwerp and settle in Brussels in 1674. He was forced to leave many paintings with his creditors in Antwerp.

He likely remained the remainder of his life in Brussels where he died some time between 1679 and 1699.

== Work ==
=== General ===
Mattheus van Helmont is known for his large output, which is generally signed or monogrammed, but rarely dated. His known works can be dated to the period from 1638 to 1670. He was a genre painter and specialised in painting interior scenes with peasants, alchemists and craftsmen at work, tavern interiors, village scenes, market scenes and kermesses. He also painted some still lifes. He is reported to have painted singeries, a genre popularized by David Teniers the Younger and depicting monkeys appearing in human attire and a human environment. However, there exist no firm attributions to van Helmont of works in this genre. He may have produced 'guardroom scenes', i.e. scenes depicting an interior scene with officers and soldiers engaged in merrymaking. However, the Guardroom with the Release of St. Peter (Sold at Colnaghi Old Masters), formerly attributed to him has now been re-attributed to a follower of David Teniers the Younger.

Whereas most of his village scenes depict Flemish villages, he also painted scenes of Italian-looking villages and towns such as the Market scene in an imaginary Italian town. He is known to have contributed staffage for the landscapes of Jacques d'Arthois.

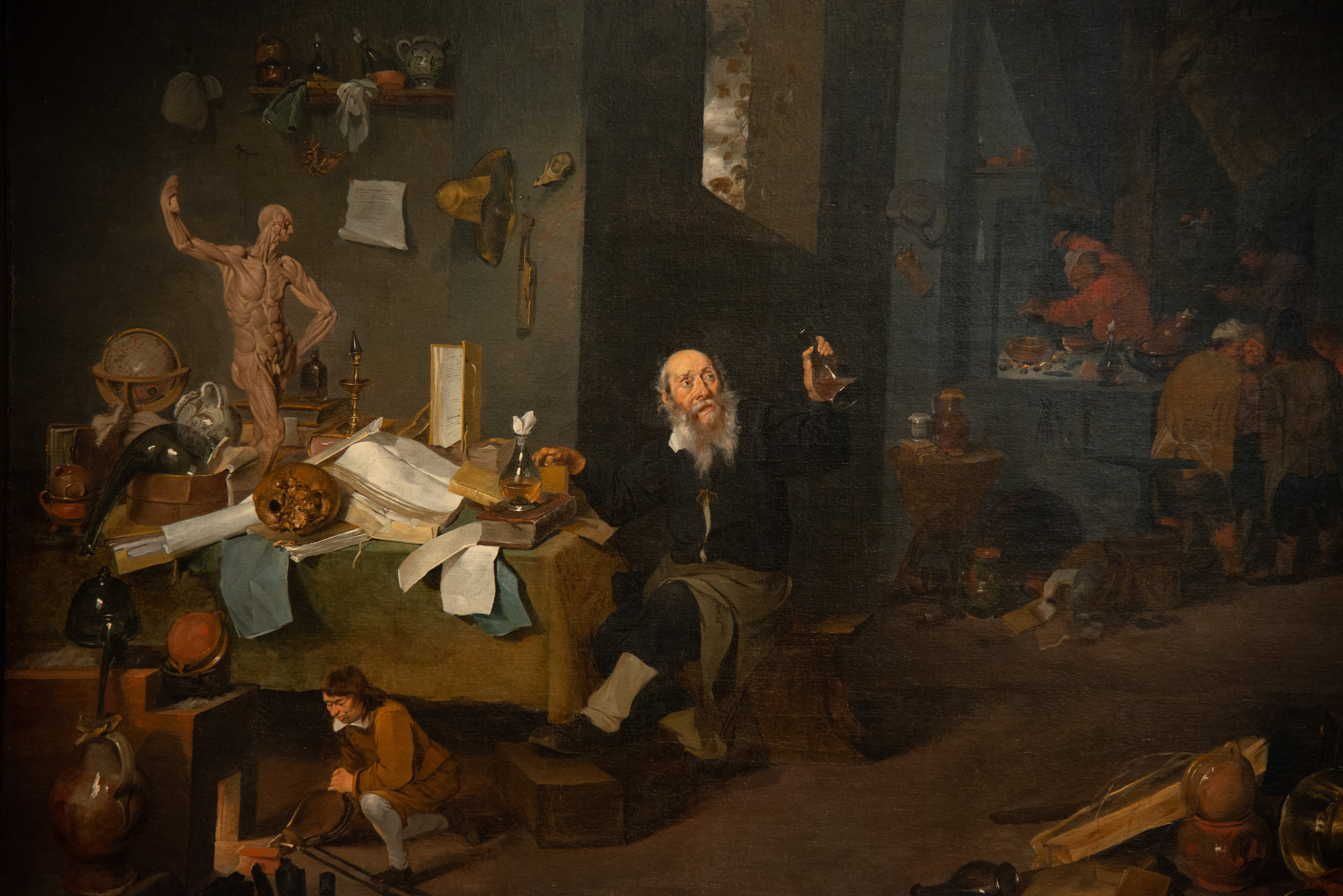
The Alchemist

Van Helmont was stylistically and thematically influenced by Adriaen Brouwer, David Ryckaert III and David Teniers II. In the final phase of his career his style became more personal.

=== Alchemists at work ===
Another popular genre scene which van Helmont painted was the alchemist at work. This was also a theme that was popularised by Teniers. Alchemists and artists had much in common, including the grinding and mixture of chemicals which artists used for pigments. This is shown in van Helmont's The Alchemist (Science History Institute). Many of the objects found in the alchemist's rooms might also be found in an artist's studio. The écorché plaster sculpture on the desk shows muscle groups under the skin, of use to artists and also to alchemists interested in physical health. The violin, symbolic of inspiration, is often shown in paintings of painters' studios, but its meaning could apply equally well to alchemists. Books, glassware, a human skull, distillation apparatus, and the furnaces in the painting are all part of the productive clutter of equipment in a busy alchemist's shop.

=== The Temptation of Saint Anthony ===
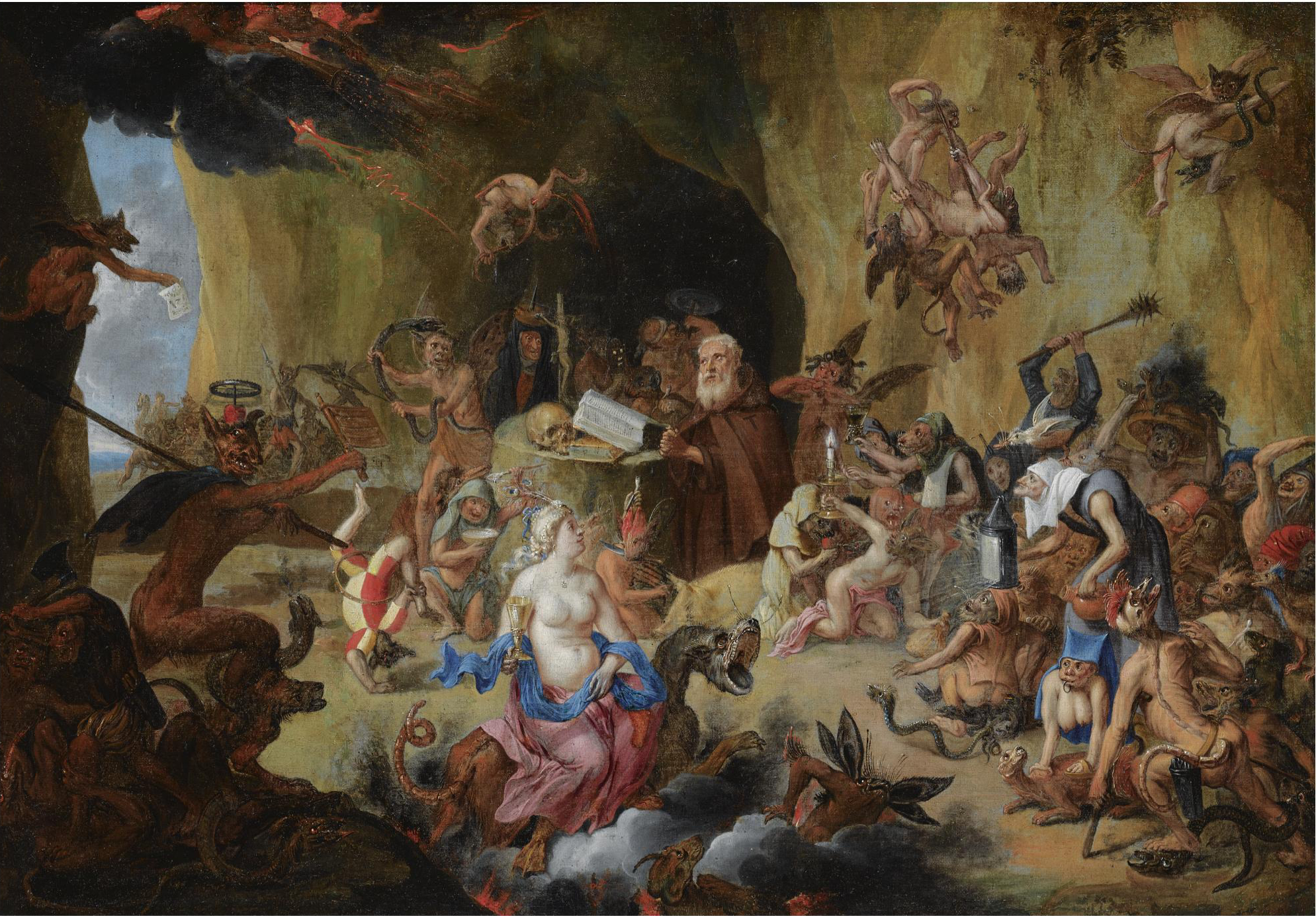
Temptation of Saint Anthony

Van Helmont produced multiple versions of The Temptation of Saint Anthony. This subject was very popular in Flemish art from the late 15th century. Catholics regard Saint Anthony as a model to be emulated as he is believed to have resisted multiple temptations sent to him by the devil. Flemish paintings dealing with the theme of the temptation of Saint Anthony are typically populated with witches and monstrous creatures that tempt him. In the 17th century David Teniers the Younger and his brother Abraham Teniers often returned to the theme.

A composition of The Temptation of Saint Anthony sold at Sotheby's (7 May 2008 in Amsterdam, lot 24) shows Saint Anthony kneeling in front of a block of stone resembling an altar on which several religious objects are placed. While David Teniers humanized his witches and creatures in appearance as well as behaviour, van Helmont seems to continue the 16th-century tradition of emphasising their monstrosity. Van Helmont also elected to give the role of female temptress to a highly seductive, bare-breasted woman unlike Teniers who opted for a beautiful but decently dressed young woman.
