= Jan van Helmont (painter) =

Flemish painter born 1650

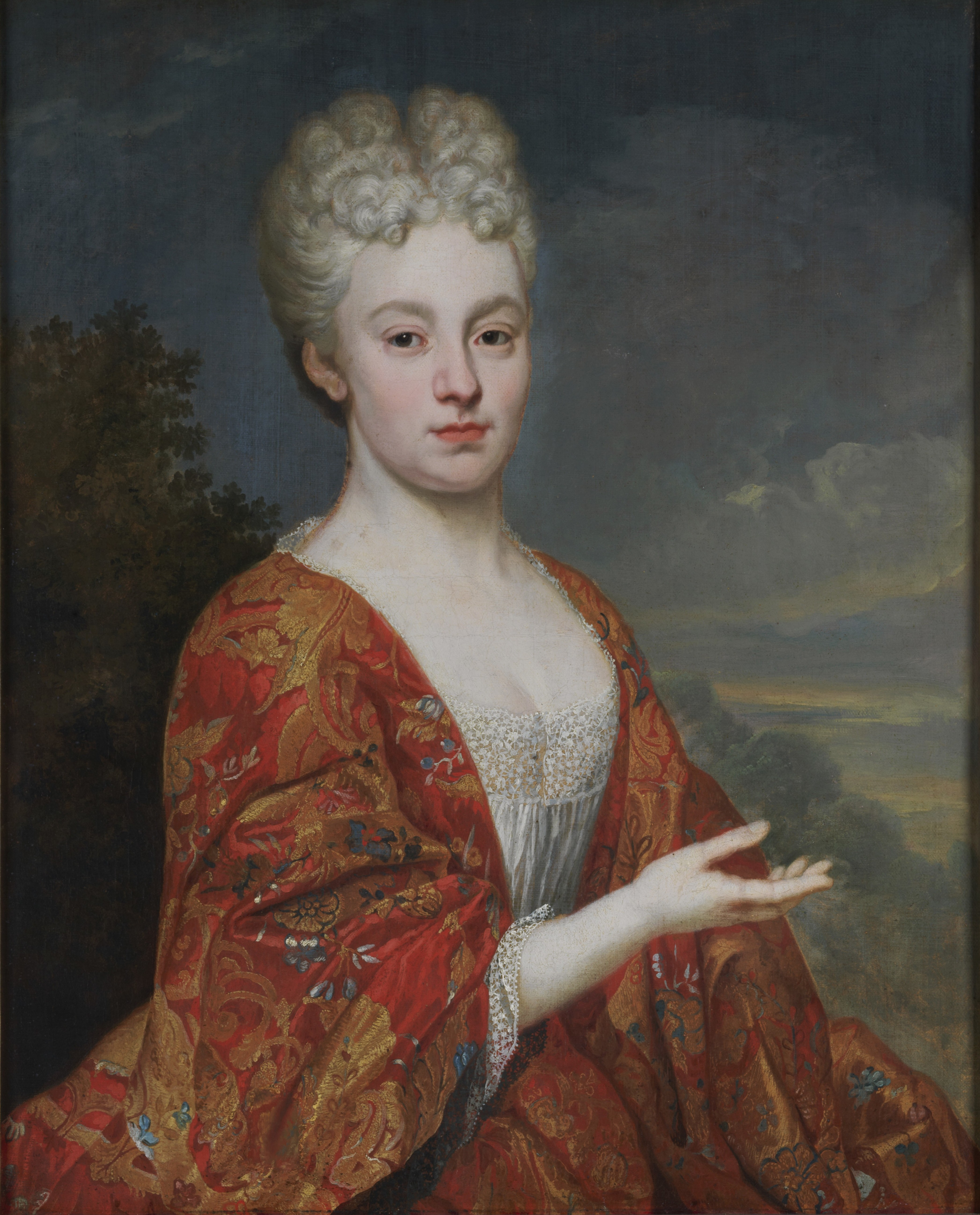
Portrait of Theresia Mechtildis Schilders

Jan van Helmont (Antwerp, 14 February 1650 – d. between 1714 and 1734) was a Flemish painter of history subjects, genre scenes and portraits.

== Life ==
Jan van Helmont was born in Antwerp as the son of the genre painter Mattheus van Helmont. There are no records about his artistic training. He became a master of the Antwerp Guild of St Luke in 1675–1676. In 1676 he became a member of the 'Sodaliteit der Bejaerde Jongmans', a fraternity for bachelors established by the Jesuit order. In 1690 he became a consultor of the 'Sodaliteit der Getrouwden', a fraternity for married men established by the Jesuit order.

Jan van Helmont married on 26 August 1679 Isabella le Rousseau and was the father of the painter and tapestry designer Zeger Jacob van Helmont.

Van Helmont had a number of pupils including Jan le Grand and Jan-Frederickx Verspecken (1682–1683), Peter van Roy (1683–1684), Niclaes van Diest (1685–1686), Ferdinandus Colijns, Petrus de Wolff and Carolus-Henricus Lefever (1696–1697).

== Works ==
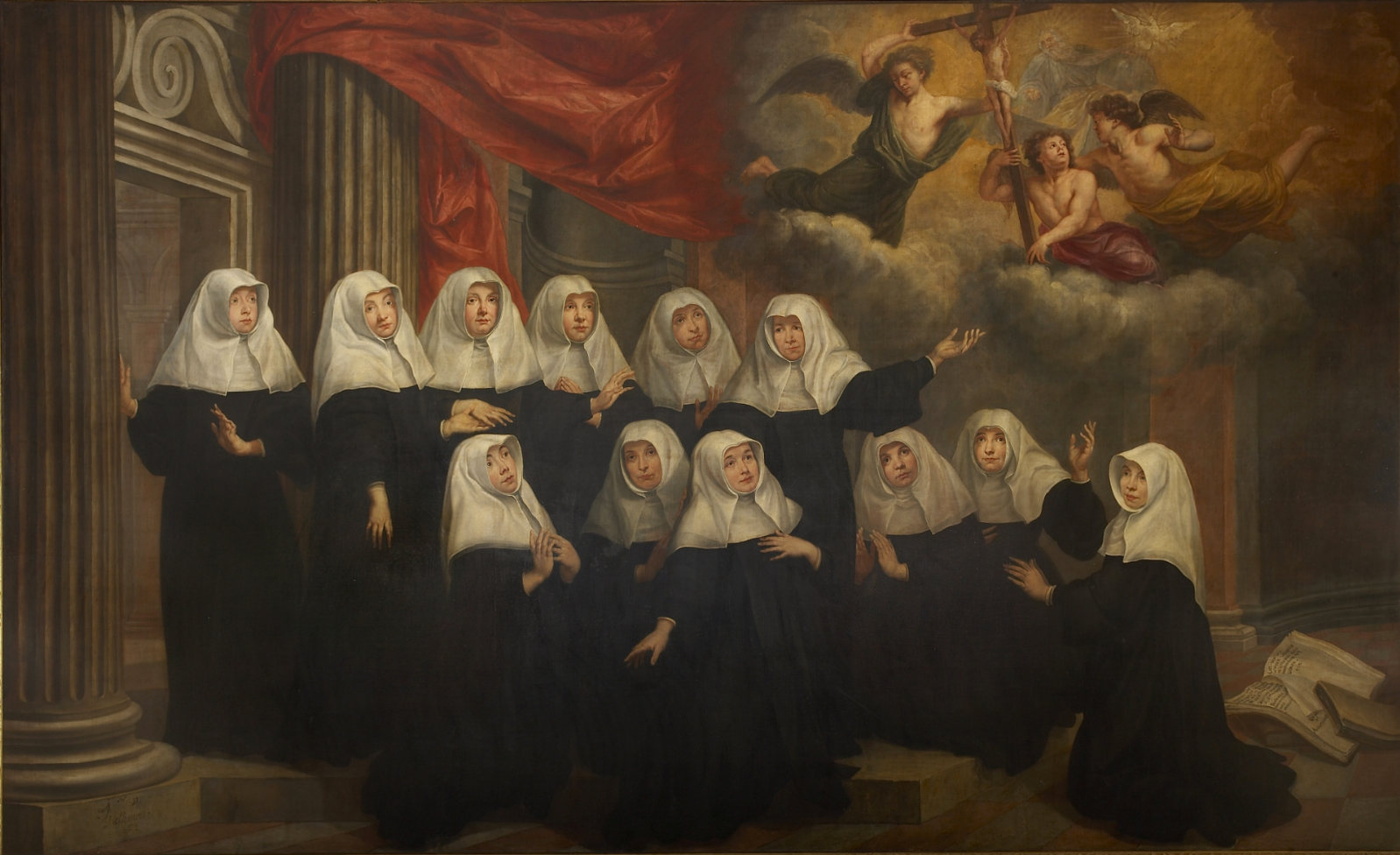
Portrait of Black Canon Augustinian nuns

Jan van Helmont was a painter of history subjects, genre scenes and portraits. He painted many portraits of prominent personalities of his time including Johannes Jacobus Moretus and his wife Theresia Mechtildis Schilders (1717, Plantin-Moretus Museum), the then owners of the Plantin Moretus printing house in Antwerp. He received regularly commissions from the Antwerp city authorities to paint portraits of historic figures such as Alexander Farnese, Duke of Parma and to restore the portraits of the 34 sovereigns in the state room of the Antwerp City Hall.

Some of van Helmont's portrait paintings were later engraved by the Dutch engraver Jacob Houbraken. An example is the Portrait of Adriaan van Borssele van der Hooge, which was engraved by Houbraken after a drawing made by Aart Schouman after a painting by Jan van Helmont. Jan van Helmont made designs for engravings by the Antwerp engraver Gaspar Bouttats. An example is the Coat of arms in an oval flanked by angels (c. 1674 British Museum), which is an engraving by Bouttats after a drawing by van Helmont of a memorial plaque for the noble lady Isabelle de Berchem.

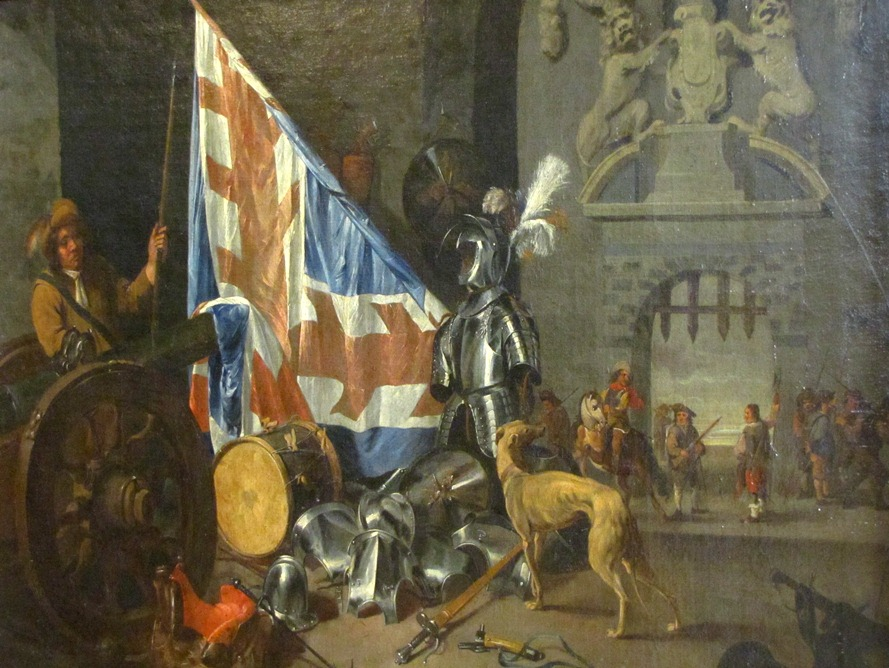
Guardroom scene

Jan van Helmont created history paintings on religious subjects for churches throughout Flanders including in Aalst, Willebroek and Wambeek.

The collection of the Museum of Military History, Vienna holds a 'guardroom scene' by Jan van Helmont. A guardroom scene typically depicts a scene with officers and soldiers engaged in merrymaking. Guardroom scenes often included mercenaries and prostitutes dividing booty, harassing captives or indulging in other forms of reprehensible activities. The genre became popular in the mid-17th century, particularly in the Dutch Republic. In Flanders there were also a few practitioners of the genre including David Teniers the Younger, Abraham Teniers, Anton Goubau, Cornelis Mahu, Jan Baptist Tijssens the Younger and Jan van Helmont's father Mattheus. Van Helmont's composition depicts soldiers in front of a gate. On the left there is a soldier holding up a flag over a cannon, a pile of weapons, armour and a drum. The armour depicted in the picture was already out of date at the time it was painted since metal armours, breast plates and helmets fell out of use from the 1620s. It is possible that in line with the moralizing intent of the genre, the armour is a reference to the vanitas motif of the transience of power and fame.
