= Temptation of Saint Anthony in visual arts =

Subject in art

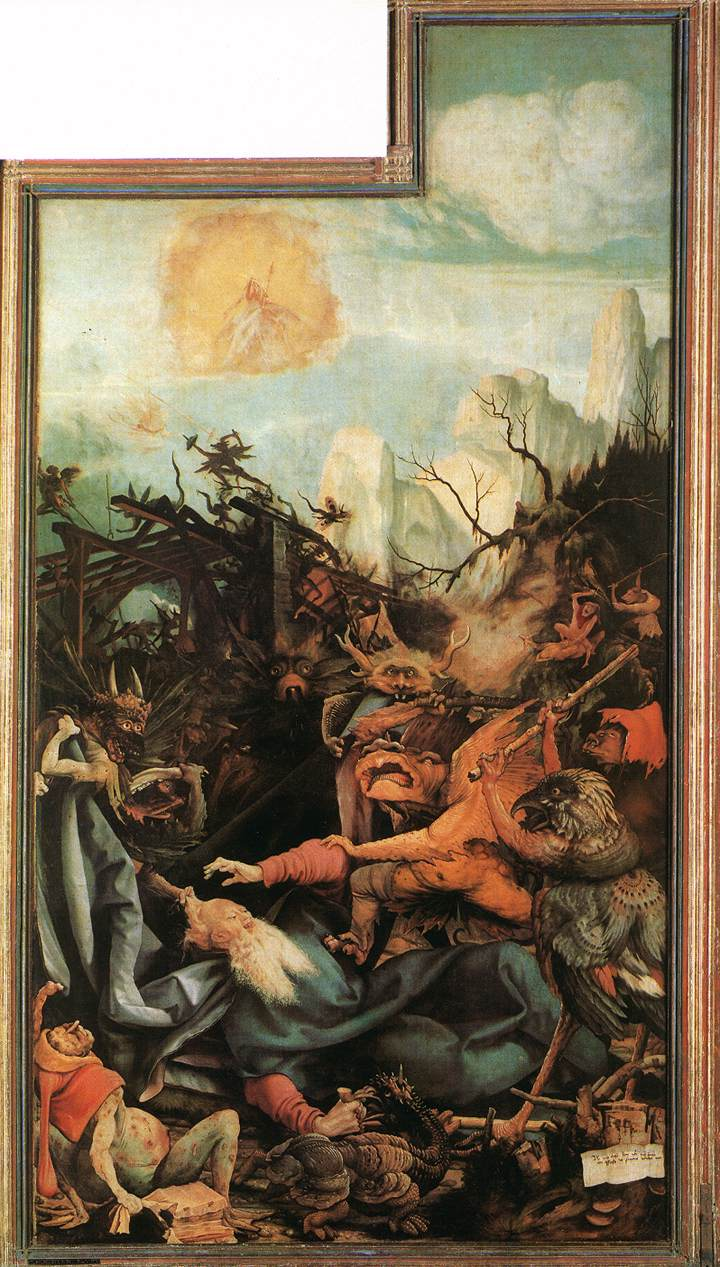
Matthias Grünewald, inner right wing of the Isenheim Altarpiece depicting the Temptation of St. Anthony, 1512–1516 (oil on panel)

The Temptation of Saint Anthony is an often-repeated subject in the history of art and literature, concerning the supernatural temptation reportedly faced by Saint Anthony the Great during his sojourn in the Egyptian desert. Anthony's temptation is first discussed by Athanasius of Alexandria, Anthony's contemporary, and from then became a popular theme in Western culture.

The common medieval subject, included in the Golden Legend and other sources, shows Saint Anthony being tempted or assailed in the desert by demons, whose temptations he resisted; the Temptation of St Anthony (or Trial...) is the more common name of the subject. But strictly there are at least two different episodes deriving from Athanasius's Life of St. Anthony and later versions of the life that may be represented, though all usually have this name. The most common temptation is by seductive women and other demonic forms. However, the Martin Schongauer composition (copied by Michelangelo) probably shows a later episode where St. Anthony, normally flown about the desert supported by angels, was ambushed and attacked in mid-air by devils. Anasthasius describes another episode where the saint was attacked on the ground.

== History ==
The Temptation of Saint Anthony, 1487–88, by the young Michelangelo, copying Martin Schongauer's engraving

The earliest work to depict Saint Anthony being assaulted by demons is a wall painting in the atrium of Santa Maria Antiqua of the 10th century. The subject became especially popular in the late European Middle Ages, from around 1450. The century following saw the most famous depictions in book illumination, prints and paintings. These include the depictions of Martin Schöngauer (ca. 1470), Hieronymus Bosch (ca. 1505) and Matthias Grünewald (1512–1516).

In the modern era the theme has been treated by the Spanish painter Salvador Dalí and the French author Gustave Flaubert, who considered his 1874 book The Temptation of Saint Anthony to be his masterwork. Flaubert's contemporary Odilon Redon was inspired by the 1874 interpretation to create three series of lithographs. The works have been compiled together in publications including a free eBook by Project Gutenberg.

In 1946 the David L. Loew-Albert Lewin film production company held a contest for a painting on the theme of Saint Anthony's Temptation, with the winner to be used in the film The Private Affairs of Bel Ami. Various artists produced paintings on this subject, and the contest was won by Max Ernst, whose work was duly shown in the film. However, the most well-known of these paintings is a failed contestant, Salvador Dalí's version.

== Notable versions of the subject ==
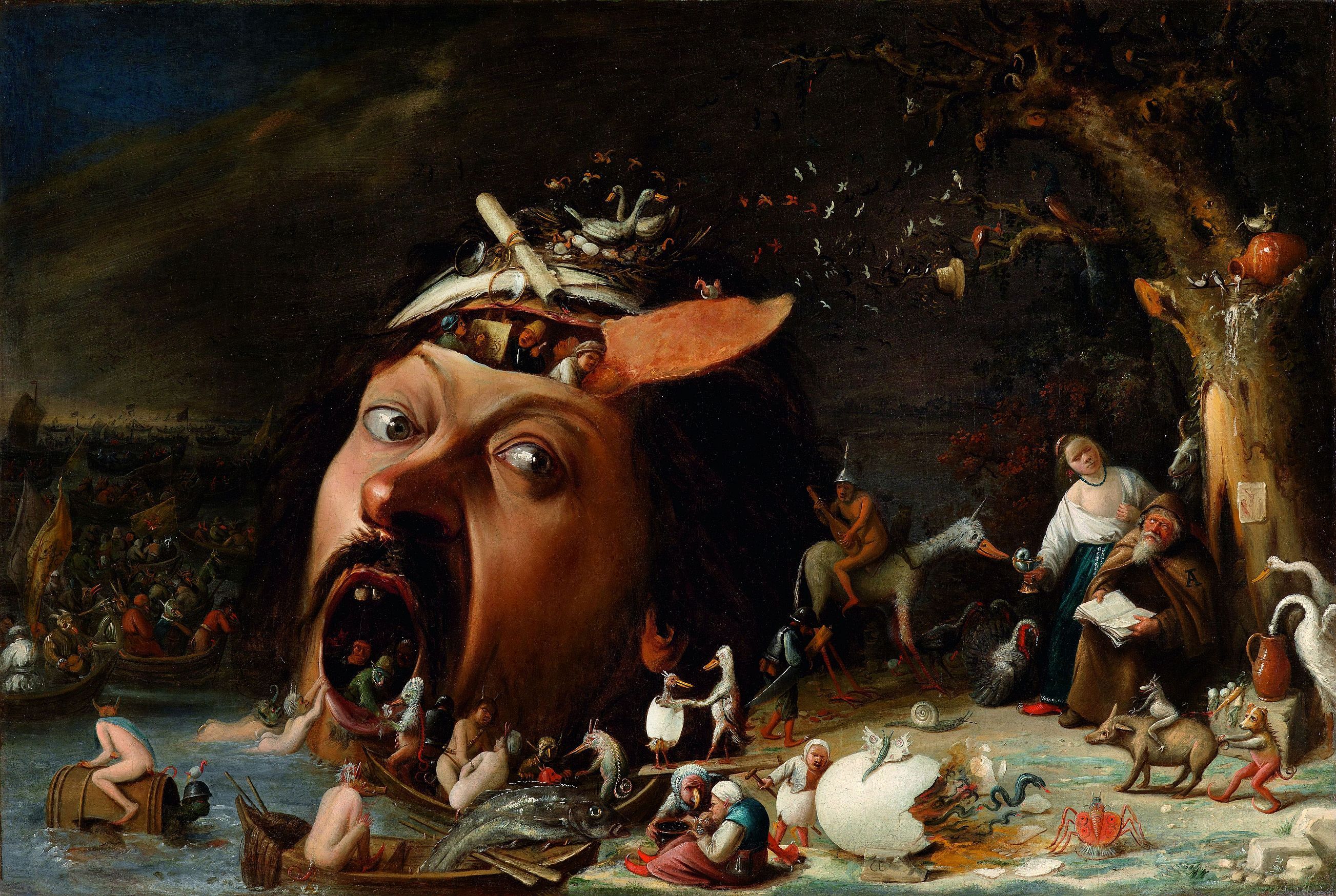
The Temptation of St. Anthony, by Joos van Craesbeeck, c. 1650, clearly recalling the Bosch treatments.

- Saint Anthony Abbot Tempted by a Heap of Gold, Sienese, 15th century
- The Temptation of St Anthony, a widely circulated engraving by Martin Schongauer
- The Temptation of Saint Anthony, a 15th-century painting by Michelangelo (his first), which was painted after the Schongauer engraving, in the Kimbell Museum in Ft. Worth.
- Triptych of the Temptation of St. Anthony, Hieronymus Bosch, c. 1501, in the National Museum of Ancient Art in Lisbon.
- The Temptation of St Anthony, a 16th-century painting by Hieronymus Bosch or a follower, in the Prado Museum in Madrid.
- The Temptation of St Anthony, another Bosch version, in Kansas City
- Isenheim Altarpiece by Matthias Grünewald (1512–1516)
- The Temptation of St. Anthony, a 1547 painting by Pieter Huys
- The Temptation of Saint Anthony, a 1598–1600 painting by Annibale Carracci
- The Temptation of St. Anthony, a 1645 print by Jacques Callot
- The Temptation of St. Anthony, a c. 1650 work by David Teniers the Younger
- The Temptation of St. Anthony, a 1650 painting by Joos van Craesbeeck
- The Temptation of Saint Anthony, several 17th-century paintings by Mattheus van Helmont
- The Temptation of St. Antonius, an 1887 painting by Paul Cézanne
- The Temptation of St. Anthony, an 1897 painting by Lovis Corinth
- The Temptation of Saint Anthony, a 1917 painting by Robert Auer
- The Temptation of Saint Anthony, a 1945 painting by Max Ernst
- The Temptation of St. Anthony, a 1946 painting by Salvador Dalí
- The Temptation of St. Anthony, 1942–5, a series of paintings by Michael Ayrton
- The Temptation of St. Anthony, a 1945 painting by Leonora Carrington
- The Temptations of Saint Anthony / Las tentaciones de San Antonio, a c. 1947 painting by Diego Rivera
- The Temptation of Saint Anthony, a fictional modern painting featured in Kurt Vonnegut's 1973 novel Breakfast of Champions
- The Temptation of St Anthony, a 1987 painting by Rose Wylie
