= The Temptation of St. Anthony (Dalí) =

1946 painting by Salvador Dalí

- Artist: Salvador Dalí
- Year: 1946
- Medium: oil on canvas
- Dimensions: 90 cm × 119.5 cm (35 in × 47.0 in)
- Location: Royal Museum of Fine Arts of Belgium, Brussels

The Temptation of St. Anthony is an oil on canvas painting by Spanish surrealist artist Salvador Dalí, from 1946. It is considered a precursor to the body of Dalí's work commonly known as the "classical period" or the "Dalí Renaissance".

== History ==
Dalí painted The Temptation of St. Anthony in 1946, in response to a contest held by the David L. Loew–Albert Lewin film production company for a painting of the temptation of Saint Anthony, to be used in the film The Private Affairs of Bel Ami. This was the only art contest in which Dalí participated, and the painting chosen for the film was Max Ernst's version of the temptation.

The painting contains many surrealistic elements typical of his work. Significantly, it was the first of his pieces to exhibit his interest in the intermediates between Heaven and Earth. The painting is now at the Royal Museums of Fine Arts of Belgium, in Brussels, Belgium.

== Description ==
Artists and authors have long represented the temptation of Saint Anthony in their art. The Temptation of St. Anthony is painted with oil on canvas. It depicts a desert-like landscape: a low horizon line with high clouds and dark, warm tones in an azure sky. The figure of Saint Anthony kneels in the bottom left corner. He holds up a cross in his right hand and with his left hand supports himself on an ambiguous form. A human skull lies by his right foot. A parade of elephants led by a horse approach St. Anthony. The horse is a depiction of Satan (note the reverse of the hooves); many artists of the Middle Ages depicted anything other than Christian as upside down or reverse, and Dalí did the same here, but the horse as Satan was described by Dalí as beautiful, terrible and impossible. The elephants carry symbolic objects representing temptation: a statue of a nude woman holding her breasts, an obelisk, a building complex confining a nude, disembodied female torso, and a vertical tower. The animals have exaggerated, long, spindly legs, making them appear weightless.

== Interpretations ==
The title, The Temptation of St. Anthony, provides clues as to the meaning of the painting and its iconography. In this painting various temptations appear to Saint Anthony (the naked man in the painting). The temptations are led by Satan depicted in the form of a horse, who is seen by Dalí as at once beautiful, terrible and impossible, rearing up and turning away from Anthony's primitive wooden cross.

The form of the elephant, carrying on its back the golden cup of lust in which a nude woman is standing, emphasizes the erotic character of the composition. The other elephants are carrying buildings on their backs; the first carries an obelisk inspired by that of Bernini in Rome, and the second and third are burdened with Venetian edifices in the style of Palladio.

The focal point is the animal parade because it is the largest element in the painting, turning the viewer's focus towards temptation. In the background, another elephant carries a tall tower that displays phallic overtones, and in the clouds one can glimpse a few fragments of the Escorial, a symbol of temporal and spiritual order.

All temptation must be opposed by Saint Anthony, using his cross to ward off the vision. The saint is naked, suggesting the saint's weakness, and thus juxtaposing it with the power of the cross, which must overcome his temptation.

== Analysis ==
Saint Anthony is seen on one knee, holding out the cross against the advancing parade of creatures, topped with various representations of erotic imagery. The rearing horse represents Satan, note the reverse of the hooves, leading the temptations mounted on the elephant's backs. The obelisk mounted on the elephant's back is an homage to Elephant and Obelisk, the Roman obelisk designed by Gian Lorenzo Bernini. The proceeding elephants carry structures reminiscent of the Palladian and the next with a phallic tower. In the clouds behind the elephants, glimpses of El Escorial can be seen, representing spiritual and temporal disorder.

Dalí chose to paint subjects that he considered spiritual, and to reveal hidden powers in them. He believed that all objects possessed this power, and desired to capture it in his painting and his own possession by painting them; this was inspired by a fascination he had with the atomic bomb, which he found particularly mystical and powerful. By using the artistic style of classicism, Dalí's aim was to use its realism to bring him closer to the spirituality contained in all substances and, therefore, closer to the divine. The piece is the first of his works that uses classicism in this way, and is a precursor to other themes that were brought on by this interest in spirituality, such as levitation and the neutralization of gravity.

== See also ==
- List of works by Salvador Dalí
- The Temptation of St. Anthony (Carrington)
