= The Temptation of Saint Anthony (Ernst) =

1945 painting by Max Ernst

- Artist: Max Ernst
- Year: 1945
- Medium: Oil on canvas
- Dimensions: 108 cm × 128 cm (43 in × 50 in)
- Location: Lehmbruck Museum; Duisburg

The Temptation of Saint Anthony is a 1945 painting by the German artist Max Ernst. It depicts the desert father Anthony the Great as he is tormented by demons in Egypt. The painting is located at the Lehmbruck Museum in Duisburg, Germany.

The painting was made for the "Bel Ami International Art Competition", where 11 surrealist and magic realist painters were asked to submit a painting to be used in Albert Lewin's film The Private Affairs of Bel Ami, based on Guy de Maupassant's novel Bel Ami. The painting, which should be 36 × 48 inches and on the subject of the temptation of Saint Anthony, would be shown as the only colour segment in the otherwise black and white film. The invited artists were Ivan Le Lorraine Albright, Eugène Berman, Leonora Carrington, Salvador Dalí, Paul Delvaux, Max Ernst, O. Louis Guglielmi, Horace Pippin, Abraham Rattner, Stanley Spencer, and Dorothea Tanning. All contestants except Fini did deliver a painting. The judges of the competition were Marcel Duchamp, Alfred H. Barr Jr. and Sidney Janis.

All artists who submitted a painting received $500, while the winner received a prize of $3000. Ernst won the competition and his painting was shown in the film. Dalí's entry also became famous in its own right.

The film critic Bosley Crowther of The New York Times called Ernst's painting "downright nauseous" and wrote that it "looks like a bad boiled lobster".

== See also ==
- The Temptation of St. Anthony (Carrington)
