= The Temptation of St. Anthony (Carrington) =

Painting by Leonora Carrington

- Artist: Leonora Carrington
- Year: 1945
- Medium: Oil on canvas
- Dimensions: 122 cm × 91 cm (48 in × 36 in)
- Location: Private collection

The Temptation of St. Anthony (Spanish: La tentación de San Antonio) is a 1945 painting by Mexican-English artist Leonora Carrington.

== History and description ==
The Temptation of St. Anthony was created for the Bel Ami International Art Competition, in which the winning work would be featured in the film The Private Affairs of Bel Ami (1947), an American drama directed by Albert Lewin. Lewin commissioned multiple artists, including Carrington, to paint their own version of a passage about Anthony the Great and paid each US$500.

Anthony is depicted as a fragile androgynous figure dressed in umbrella-shaped white garments, featuring three faces that represent his journey from meditation to enlightenment. Next to him appear many of the temptations he faced, including a pig that represents gluttony and comfort, and the Queen of Sheba, dressed in red, representing lust. Also featured is a woman with a black gown, whose veil is held by several other women, while holding a natural horn.

== Reception ==
The Temptation of St. Anthony was sold at an auction for US$2.6 million in 2014. In 2026, American singer Madonna paid tribute to the painting at the Met Gala ceremony, wearing a black Yves Saint Laurent gown designed by Anthony Vaccarello, depicting imagery inspired by the painting.

== See also ==
- The Temptation of St. Anthony (Dalí)
- The Temptation of Saint Anthony (Ernst)
