= The Moon and Sixpence (1942 film) =

1942 film by Albert Lewin

- Film poster
- Directed by: Albert Lewin; John E. Burch (assistant)
- Screenplay by: Albert Lewin
- Based on: The Moon and Sixpence; 1919 novel by W. Somerset Maugham
- Produced by: David L. Loew
- Starring: George Sanders; Herbert Marshall; Doris Dudley
- Cinematography: John F. Seitz
- Edited by: Richard L. Van Enger
- Music by: Dimitri Tiomkin
- Production companies: David L. Loew-Albert Lewin, Inc.
- Distributed by: United Artists
- Release date: October 27, 1942
- Running time: 89 minutes
- Country: United States
- Language: English
- Box office: $1.2 million (US rentals)

The Moon and Sixpence is a 1942 film adaptation of W. Somerset Maugham's 1919 novel of the same name, which was in part based on the life of the painter Paul Gauguin. Dimitri Tiomkin was nominated for the Academy Award for Best Music, Scoring of a Dramatic or Comedy Picture. Two versions were filmed. In one, Devi Wani, a Javanese actress, played Ata; in the other, Ms. Verdugo played her, to accommodate audiences for whom marriage between a Polynesian and an Englishman was considered unacceptable.

== Plot ==
Geoffrey Wolfe, a writer similar to Maugham, tells the story of Charles Strickland. A mediocre, seemingly unassuming London stockbroker, Strickland suddenly gives up his career, wife of 17 years, and children and moves to Paris. Mrs. Strickland asks Wolfe to bring him back. To Wolfe's surprise, Strickland has not run away with another woman (as he had been told), but because Strickland feels compelled to become a painter. He exhibits no remorse or shame about abandoning his family and refuses to return to his old life, whereupon his wife divorces him. Despite his strong disapproval of Strickland's callous behavior, Wolfe is fascinated.

Several years later, Wolfe is in Paris to see his friend, kindhearted Dirk Stroeve. Stroeve is a bad painter, but an astute judge of others' talent. When Wolfe asks if he knows Strickland, he confidently states that the man is a great painter, even though he has not sold any of his work and barely ekes out a living with odd jobs. However, Stroeve's beloved wife Blanche loathes the man.

Finding Strickland seriously ill near Christmas, Stroeve persuades a very reluctant Blanche to take him into their happy home, promising to nurse him back to health by himself. After six weeks, the artist recovers and makes himself at home, even evicting his host from his own studio. When Stroeve asks him to leave, Blanche unexpectedly announces she is going with him. Stroeve first tries to throttle Strickland. Then, after regaining his composure, he gives the couple the apartment and departs himself.

Later, Strickland discards Blanche (he only accepted her because he wanted to study the female form), and she commits suicide. Even after all this, Stroeve offers to put Strickland up at his mother's home in Holland. He declines.

Wolfe travels to Tahiti, where he learns of Strickland's fate from Captain Nichols and Tiara Johnson. Tiara had arranged a match between Strickland and her young, infatuated cousin Ata. They marry, live happily on Ata's property, and have a child. Strickland paints as much as he wants.

Then Dr. Coutras is sent for. He informs Strickland he has contracted leprosy. Ata refuses to leave him, braving the hostility of their neighbors, though she eventually entrusts their child to others. Two years later, Coutras is summoned again. He is too late; Strickland is dead. Entering the now dilapidated house, Coutras is awestruck by the paintings adorning all of the interior, recognizing despite his lack of knowledge of art that Strickland has created masterpieces. Ata, however, burns the house down, fulfilling a promise extracted by her husband.

== Cast ==
- George Sanders as Charles Strickland
- Herbert Marshall as Geoffrey Wolfe
- Doris Dudley as Blanche Stroeve
- Eric Blore as Captain Nichols
- Albert Bassermann as Dr. Coutras
- Florence Bates as Tiara Johnson
- Steve Geray as Dirk Stroeve
- Elena Verdugo / Devi Wani as Ata
- Devi Dja as Dancer

== Preservation status ==
Because this film was independently produced, it was unavailable for many years after the initial release and 1948 re-release. On December 14, 2011, Turner Classic Movies aired a restored print from George Eastman House which includes the tinted scenes in Tahiti and the final reel in Technicolor (the scenes in London and Paris are in black and white).
