= David L. Loew =

American film producer (1897–1973)

- Born: David Leonard Loew; October 5, 1897; New York City, New York, U.S.
- Died: March 25, 1973 (aged 75); Los Angeles, California, U.S.
- Occupation: Film producer
- Years active: 1937–1948
- Spouse: Hilda Loew
- Children: 2
- Parent(s): Marcus Loew; Carrie Loew
- Relatives: Arthur Loew Sr. (twin brother); Arthur Loew Jr. (nephew)

David Leonard Loew (October 5, 1897 – March 25, 1973) was an American film producer.

== Early life and family ==
Loew was born in New York City into an Austrian-Jewish family. He and his twin brother, Arthur Loew, were born on October 5, 1897, to MGM founder Marcus Loew and his wife, Carrie. Their father had been born into a poor Jewish family that emigrated to New York City from Vienna and Germany. His nephew was film producer and actor Arthur Loew Jr. (1925–1995), the son of Arthur Loew Sr.

== Career ==
After being elected to the board of directors of Loew's, Inc. in 1922 at age 24, Loew resigned from the studio in 1935 to launch an independent production career. He began his independent work at Hal Roach Studios.

In the early 1940s, Loew partnered with director Albert Lewin, a friend and former supervisor at MGM under Irving Thalberg, to form an independent production company with Stanley Kramer. Together with Lewin, Loew released The Moon and Sixpence (1942) through United Artists. In 1943, with Arthur S. Lyons, Loew organized a company called Producing Artists, Inc.

Loew briefly took control of General Service Studio in 1943, where some of his best-remembered films were produced, including Jean Renoir's The Southerner (1945) and the Marx Brothers' A Night in Casablanca (1946). The lot reverted to Benedict Bogeaus in March 1946. The Southerner received three Academy Award nominations, including Best Director for Renoir (his only Oscar nomination), Best Music Score, and Best Sound, and won Best Feature Film at the 1946 Venice Film Festival.

With the Marx Brothers, Loew formed Loma Vista Productions to produce A Night in Casablanca, which became the trio's highest-grossing film at the time with $2.7 million in worldwide ticket sales.

At the end of World War II, Loew formed Enterprise Productions with actor John Garfield and former Warner Bros. publicity chief Charles Einfeld. Enterprise Productions was a member of the Society of Independent Motion Picture Producers (SIMPP) and was designed as an advocate of profit sharing with production talent. In 1946, Loew convinced Ingrid Bergman to join Enterprise to make Arch of Triumph (1948), her first film after fulfilling her contract with David O. Selznick. The film cost over $4 million to make and lost an estimated $2 million at the box office; United Artists executive Grad Sears called it "probably the greatest commercial failure in the history of motion pictures."

== Later life ==
After the failure of Arch of Triumph, Loew left SIMPP and grew disillusioned with film production. In the early 1950s, he abandoned his movie career to become a painter.

He died on March 25, 1973, at the UCLA Medical Center in Los Angeles. He was survived by his wife, Hilda; two sons, David L. Jr. and Marcus 2d; his brother, Arthur M. of New York; eight grandchildren; and three great-grandchildren.

== Filmography ==
- When's Your Birthday? (1937)
- Riding on Air (1937)
- Fit for a King (1937)
- Wide Open Faces (1938)
- The Gladiator (1938)
- Flirting with Fate (1938)
- So Ends Our Night (1941)
- The Moon and Sixpence (1942)
- The Southerner (1945)
- A Night in Casablanca (1946)
- Toccata and Fugue; short film (1946)
- The Private Affairs of Bel Ami (1947)
- Enchanted Lake (1947)
- Arch of Triumph (1948)

== Archives ==
The David L. Loew papers, spanning 1937–1986 and comprising approximately 10 linear feet, are held at the Margaret Herrick Library, Academy of Motion Picture Arts and Sciences. The collection contains production files and professional papers, including correspondence.
