= Raymond D. Bowman =

American journalist (1917–2001)

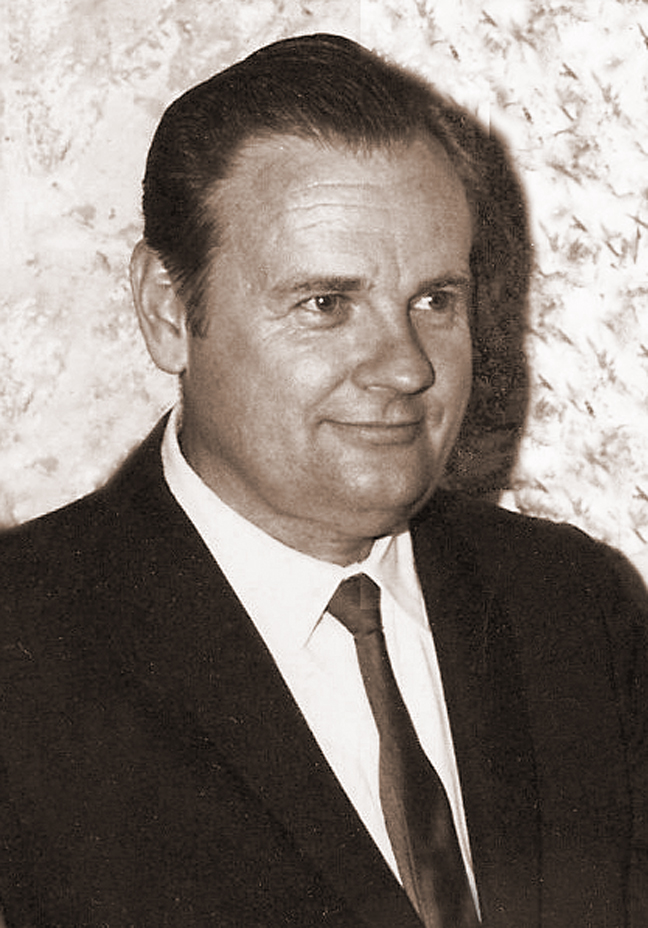
- Bowman at the Wilshire Ebell Theatre (Los Angeles) in 1963
- Born: September 4, 1917; Green Valley, Virginia, United States
- Died: December 30, 2001 (aged 84)
- Occupations: Music Critic, Concert Promoter, Pearl Harbor Survivor

Raymond DeArmond Bowman (September 4, 1917 – November 30, 2001) was an American classical, jazz, and ethnic (world) music critic, concert promoter, and writer, based in Southern California. He was a survivor of the Pearl Harbor attack on December 7, 1941, and was an early member of the Pearl Harbor Survivors Association.

He was born in Green Valley, Bath County, Virginia, but moved to Long Beach, California, with his family at the age of 3. As a child, he became a prodigy violinist, encouraged by his mother, who had a love of classical music.

His mother was Vesta Virginia Bowman, one of the founders of the Long Beach Women's Committee for the Philharmonic Orchestra. While attending Jefferson Middle School, his family survived the 1933 earthquake. Fortunately, the earthquake struck just after his classes let out. His mother made soup for the neighborhood in the front yard of their Loma Avenue home, which had been damaged. He went on to attend and graduate from Wilson High School. He was very active in sports and set several records in track and field. He remained a lifelong sports fan, especially of track and field, boxing, baseball, and football.

He became a member of the California Junior Symphony Orchestra and appeared in the motion picture "They Shall Have Music" in 1939. (Note: Although Bowman appeared in some scenes in the movie and was a member of the orchestra, he wasn't able to play when the orchestra actually recorded the music for the soundtrack, so he isn't heard on the score.

He signed up for the Army National Guard in Long Beach in the summer of 1940 with the 251st Air Defense Artillery Regiment, Battery G, Second Battalion, C.A.A.A., but in September 1940, his unit was called into Federal Service, along with many other National Guard units. By November 1940, he was sent to Camp Malakole at Pearl Harbor, Hawaii. A year later, he would be present during the attack by the Japanese on December 7, 1941. He was about to play a game of tennis when the attack began and quickly found himself firing an anti-aircraft gun at the planes from a bunker, wearing only his white tennis outfit. In May 1942, the 2nd Battalion of 1500 men was moved to the Fuji Islands, where they were equipped with 37mm and 50-caliber guns. He was then trained in counter-intelligence and went on to be stationed on several other islands in the South Pacific to monitor Japanese movements. He attained the rank of Master Sergeant. His total combined active and reserve enlistment would last more than 17 years. After the war, he went on to Columbia University in New York, where he took classes in literature and journalism.

In 1951, he married an English woman named Margaret Alderson, but they soon divorced. By the early 1950s, he was an entertainment agent and represented several "world" music and jazz artists through his business called "West Coast Artists," which was located on Franklin Avenue in Hollywood. Among them were jazz pianist Marv Jenkins, flamenco guitarists Clark Allen and Rene Heredia, and Balinese dancer Devi Dja. He even managed boxing legend Elbert S. "Turkey" Thompson for a while. During this time, he also served as adjutant and as a member of the executive committee at the Hollywood Post 43 of the American Legion on Highland Avenue from the mid-1950s until 1965. He was quite interested and active in veterans' affairs.

On June 1, 1960, he married the former Estrellita (Lita) Santos, a local radio celebrity and announcer at station KMPC, who had 2 children from a previous marriage, Leslieanne and Robert Christian (Anderson). He then became one of the original members of the Pearl Harbor Survivors Association and co-signed the incorporation papers a year after it was formed in 1961. In 1962, Raymond and Lita had another son, Raymond D. Bowman Jr.

By the 1960s, he evolved to become a major concert presenter of classical and jazz music in the Los Angeles performing arts scene. DownBeat Magazine nicknamed him “The Sol Hurok of the avant-garde." He met and promoted countless musicians, conductors, and composers over the years. He was also instrumental in bringing world ethnic music to the Los Angeles stage for the first time during the 1950s and 60s. On January 25, 1959, he presented the famous Viennese mime artist Cilli Wang at the Wilshire Ebell Theater in Los Angeles. The following year, on May 28, 1960, he presented Martin Denny and his "exotica" band at the Pasadena Civic Auditorium; also on the program were the Les McCann Ltd. Trio (including Leroy Vinnegar, bass, and Ron Jefferson, drums). For nearly 20 years he presented the "Monday Night Concert Series" at the Ice House in Pasadena when it was a venue for folk music, as well as a comedy club. One of the most famous performers he presented was comic Lily Tomlin. Her first record album was recorded on one of his Monday nights. He also presented the San Francisco Mime Troupe, Dennis Dreith's Nova Jazz Ensemble, Les McCann, Claire Fischer, Don Ellis, Rene Heredia and his Flamenco Show, the Aman Folk Ensemble, and many more. He also presented several concerts at the "Ash Grove" (8162 Melrose Avenue, Los Angeles) and "Century City Playhouse" (now Pico Playhouse, 10508 Pico Blvd, Los Angeles).

In 1962, Bowman teamed with dance legend Ruth St. Denis to bring the first full-length Balinese Shadow Puppet play to the United States. The performance was held at her studio located at 3433 Cahuenga Boulevard West (near Universal City) on Sunday, September 16, 1962, and lasted more than 8 hours. The following year he opened an art gallery in Beverly Hills with his good friend Eric Mann. "The Bowman-Mann Gallery" was located at 229 S. La Cienega Blvd. near Wilshire Blvd. Many famous artists gave one-man shows there, including Mae Babitz, Edgar Payne (posthumously), Leonora Cetone Starr, and Innocenzo Daraio.

He was a classical music critic for the South Bay Daily Breeze during the 1970s and was a fixture at the Dorothy Chandler Pavilion during the symphony and opera seasons. He knew most of the performers and members of the press for nearly 40 years in the Los Angeles art scene. He adored long conversations with "intellectuals" and would engage them in unlimited discussions on fine art, music, and literature until late in the night. In his later years, he was listed in the Marquis Who's Who social register, both in "Who's Who in America" and "Who's Who in the World".

He loved drives to scenic places, and one drive he enjoyed was the cliffs above San Diego Bay in Point Loma. He asked that when it was "his time", he be buried "high on a cliff overlooking Coronado and the bay". He died on November 30, 2001. His wish was granted, and his burial site at Fort Rosecrans National Cemetery overlooks that magnificent view. At his funeral were his wife Lita, his stepson Christian (who served as pallbearer), and members of the Pearl Harbor Survivors Association he had befriended over the years, who are mostly ex-Navy personnel. Ironically, an Army firing squad was unavailable to be at his funeral, so at the last minute a U. S. Marine Corps firing squad graciously stepped in to perform the ceremonial duties. He was very proud of his military career and all service members, and this would have pleased him greatly. His stepson R. Christian Anderson, a filmmaker, co-wrote the song "The Ghosts of San Francisco" (with John Thomas Bullock), which was recorded by Motown recording artist Chris Clark. The music video won "Best Mixed Genre" at the New York Jazz Film Festival in 2016 and is dedicated to Bowman's memory.
