= Riding on Air =

1937 film by Edward Sedgwick

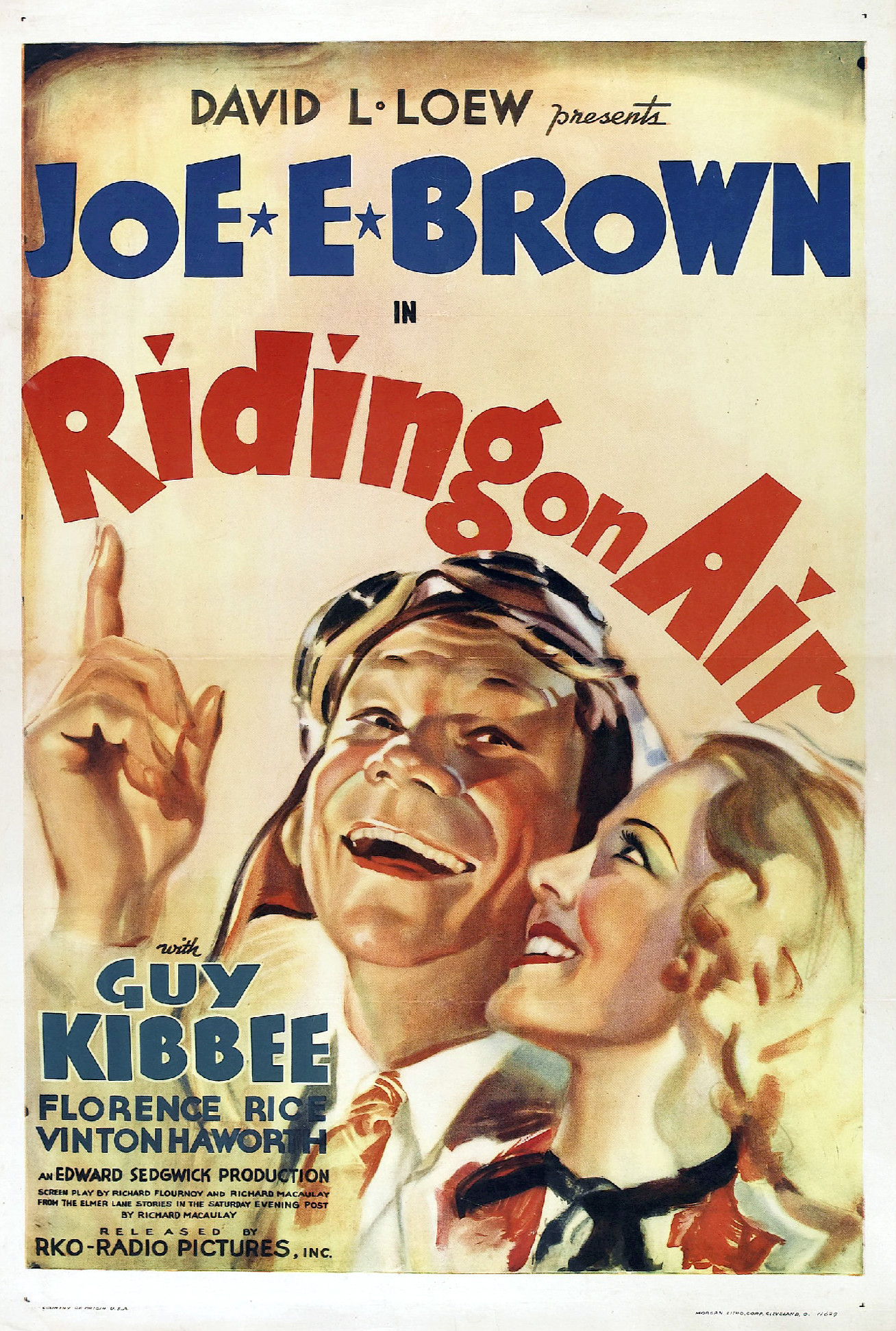
- Theatrical release poster
- Directed by: Edward Sedgwick
- Written by: Richard Macaulay (Elmer Rice character)
- Screenplay by: Richard Macaulay; Richard Flournoy
- Produced by: David L. Loew
- Starring: Joe E. Brown; Guy Kibbee; Florence Rice
- Cinematography: Alfred Gilks
- Edited by: Jack Ogilvie
- Music by: Arthur Morton; Marlin Skiles
- Production company: David L. Loew Productions
- Distributed by: RKO Radio Pictures
- Release date: June 18, 1937
- Running time: 70 minutes
- Country: United States
- Language: English

Riding on Air (known as All Is Confusion in the United Kingdom) is a 1937 American comedy film directed by Edward Sedgwick and starring Joe E. Brown, Guy Kibbee, and Florence Rice. The film was produced by David L. Loew with distribution by RKO Radio Pictures who released it on June 18, 1937.

== Plot ==
Elmer Lane, a newspaper writer, editor, amateur pilot, HAM radio operator, and gadget enthusiast, lives in 1930s rural America. In love with Betty, he attempts to buy the newspaper outright to win her affection. However, events involving gangsters, smugglers, murdered mobsters, rival newspaper reporters, con artists, police, new inventions, and small dogs interfere with his plans.

== Cast ==
- Joe E. Brown as Elmer Lane
- Guy Kibbee as J. Rutherford "Doc" Waddington
- Florence Rice as Betty Harrison
- Vinton Hayworth as Harvey Schuman
- Anthony Nace as Bill Hilton
- Harlan Briggs as Mr. Harrison
- Andrew Tombes as Eddie Byrd
- Clem Bevans as Sheriff
- Harry C. Bradley as Mayor

== Production ==
Filming began on March 8 under the working title "All is Confusion." The film's working title also became the title for the British release of the film. During production, Edward Sedgwick had to leave for the hospital due to needing an appendectomy; the day's directing was completed by Joe E. Brown.

== Soundtrack ==
- "I'm Tired of Trying to Make You Care" (Written by Henry Cohen and Edward Sedgwick)
