= The Temptation of Saint Anthony (novel) =

Book by Gustave Flaubert

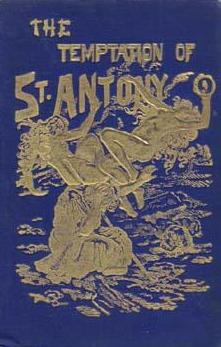
- The cover of The Temptation of Saint Anthony, an 1895 edition
- Author: Gustave Flaubert
- Original title: La Tentation de Saint Antoine
- Language: French
- Publication date: 1874
- Publication place: France

The Temptation of Saint Anthony (French: La Tentation de Saint Antoine) is a dramatic poem in prose (or a dramatic novel) by the French author Gustave Flaubert published in 1874. Flaubert spent his whole adult life working fitfully on the book.

== Origin ==
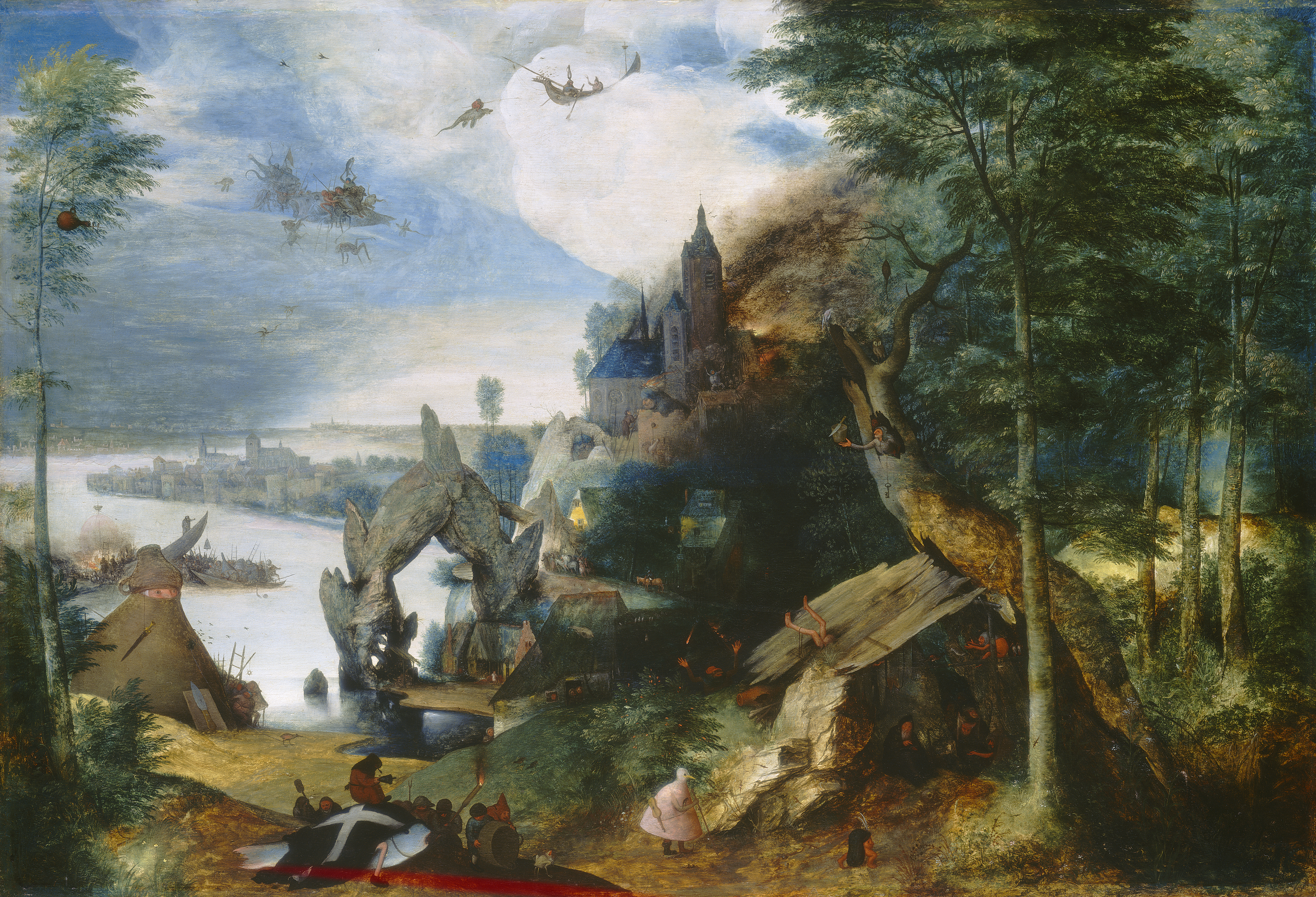
The 16th-century painting that inspired the novel

In 1845, at age 24, Flaubert visited the Balbi Palace in Genoa, and was inspired by a painting of the same title, then attributed to Bruegel the Elder (now thought to be by one of his followers). Flaubert worked at the subject in three versions, completed in 1849, 1856 (with extracts published at that time) and 1872, before publishing the final version in 1874. It takes as its subject the famous temptation faced by Saint Anthony the Great, in the Egyptian desert, a theme often repeated in medieval and modern art. It is written in the form of a play script, detailing one night in the life of Anthony the Great, during which he is faced with great temptations.

The work was illustrated by the French painter Odilon Redon.

== Temptations ==
- Frailty
- The Seven Deadly Sins
- The Heresiarchs
- The Martyrs
- The Magicians
- The Gods
- Science
- Food
- Lust and Death
- The Monsters
- Metamorphosis

== Characters ==
The following is a list of major characters and does not include characters such as the gods or the prophets. A complete list of characters can be found in the glossary of the Random House edition.

- Saint Anthony: The protagonist. He is tempted by many characters and objects to stray from his belief that isolation is the truest form of worship.
- Ammonaria: One of his sister's friends, Anthony is drawn into a battle between his desire for her and his desire to remain holy before God in his isolation. He is distraught that he cannot control his body.
- King Nebuchadnezzar
- The Queen of Sheba: Tempts Anthony with riches, trying to evoke lust.
- Hilarion: Also known as Lucifer. Once Anthony's student, now he tries to tempt him away from his chosen lifestyle by creating doubt and eventually changes into Science.
- Lust and Death: Lust appears as a young woman; Death, an old woman. They try to convince Anthony to give in to his desires and commit suicide.
