= Jan Tilens =

Flemish painter (c.1589–1630)

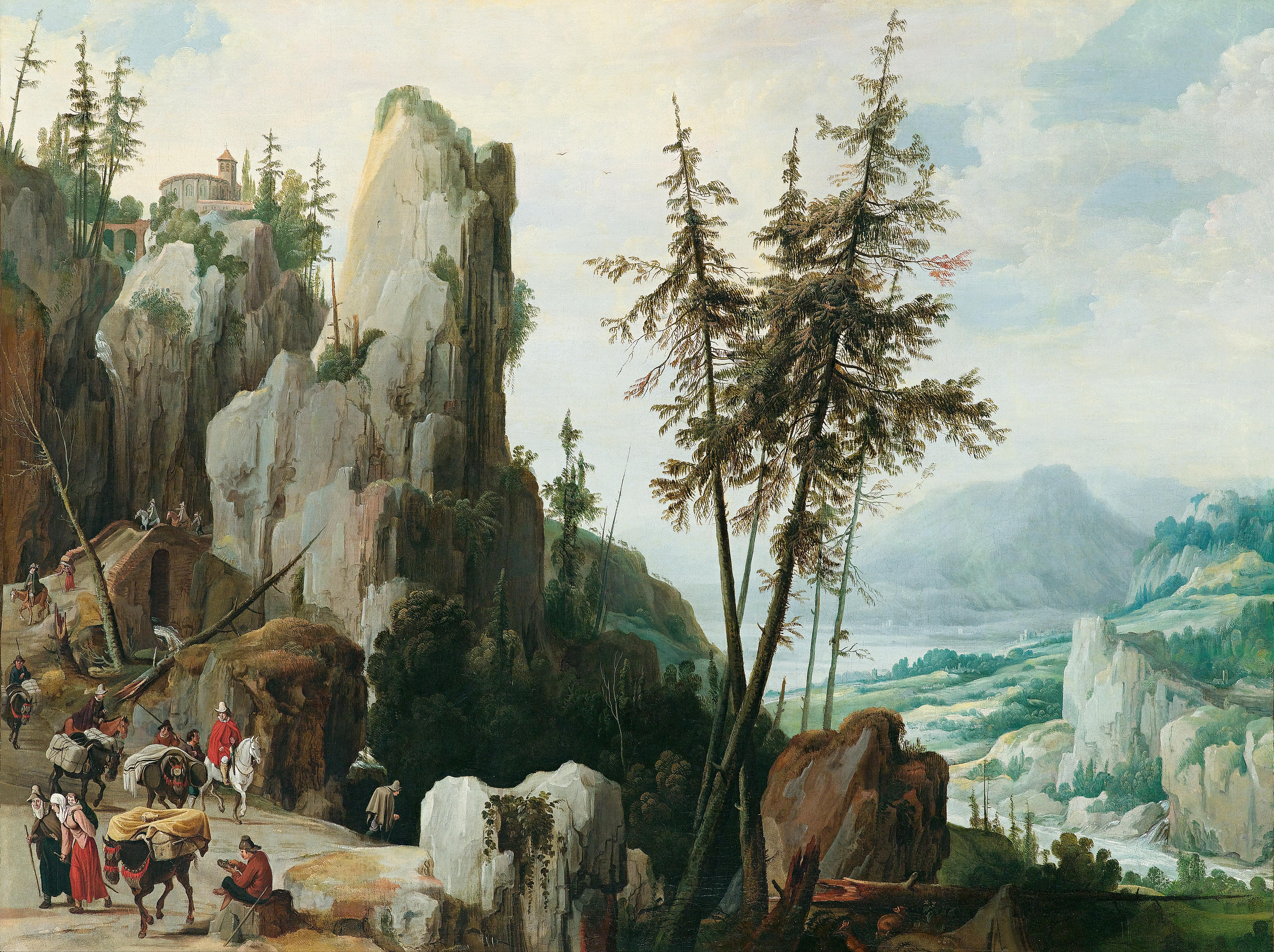
Rocky landscape with travelers

Jan Tilens or Hans Tilens (Baptized on 6 April 1589 – buried on 25 July 1630) was a Flemish painter who is mainly known for his landscapes with people depicting mythological scenes.

== Life ==
Jan Tilens was born as the son of a baker in Antwerp. The Tilens (or Tielens) family was responsible for the operation of the bakery in the Citadel of Antwerp. It is not clear with whom he trained but in 1610 the artist made a declaration that he had already completed his artistic studies. In 1612 Tilens was accepted as a master of the Guild of St. Luke of Antwerp. The record of his registration at the Guild shows that he was still residing at the Antwerp Citadel at that time.

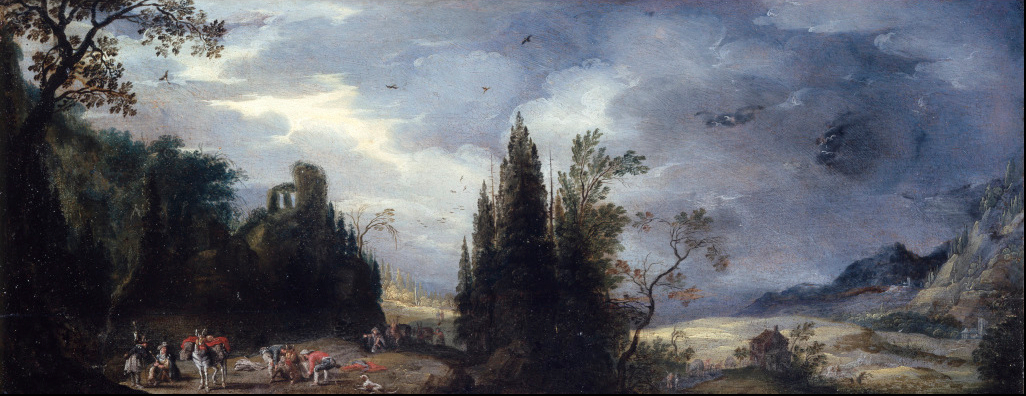
Landscape with woodcutters

On 25 October 1614 Jan Tilens married Margaretha Geleyns. The couple had five children and lived in downtown Antwerp. Jan Tilens was based in his native Antwerp for his entire career. He enjoyed the appreciation of his fellow artists. Anthony van Dyck praised his work and made a portrait of the artist. His niece Johanna Tielens married the genre painter Joos van Craesbeeck.

After becoming ill in 1629, Jan Tilens made a will. He died the next year and was buried on 25 July 1630 in Antwerp.

== Work ==
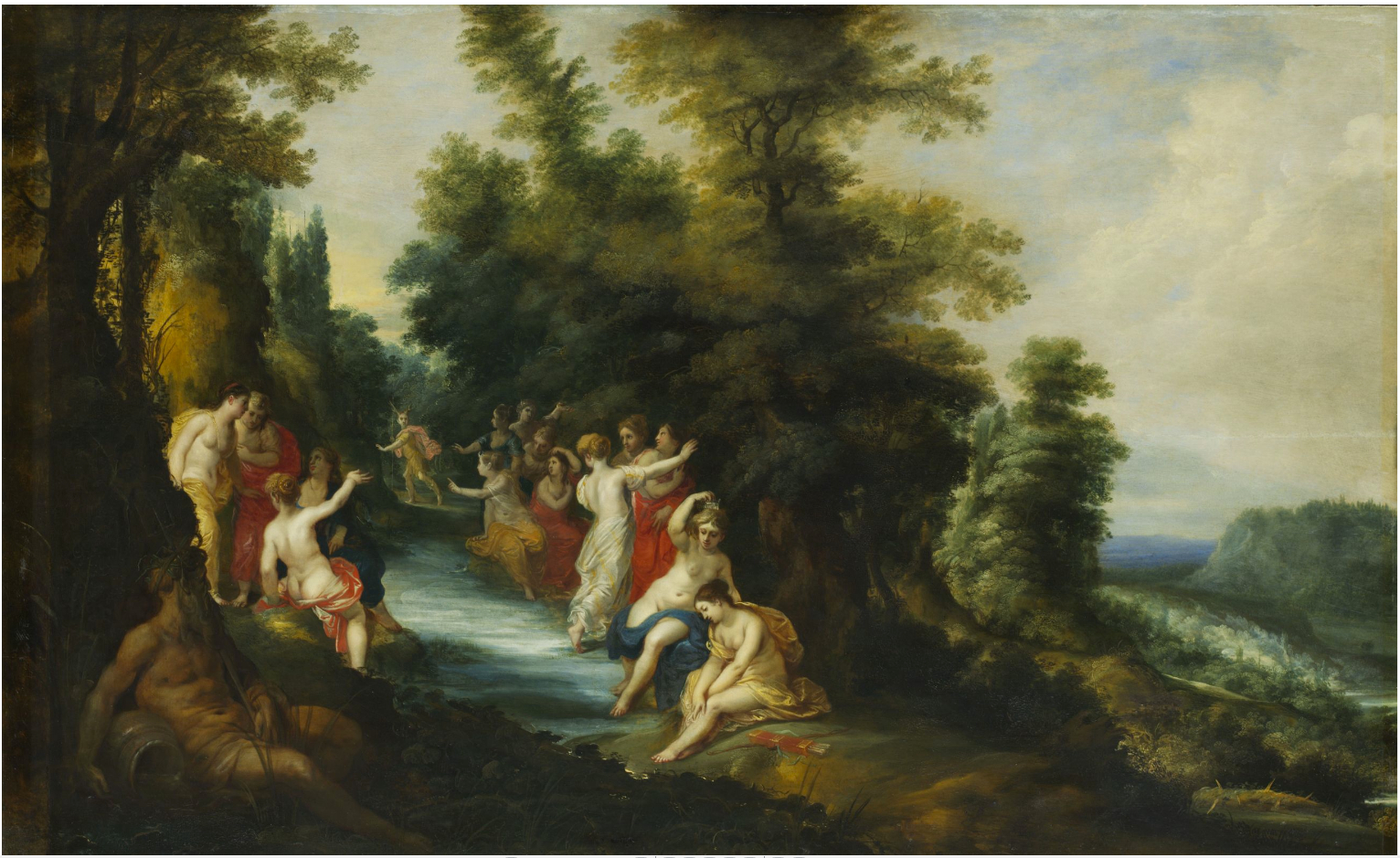
Diana and Actaeon, figures by Hendrick van Balen

Jan Tilens was a landscape specialist. His works are typically rocky landscapes with figures depicting mythological scenes or contemporary travellers. Although he never visited Italy he painted some Italiniate landscapes with antique monuments in the style of the Flemish painter Paul Bril who was active in Rome.

The artist collaborated with leading Antwerp artists such as Frans Francken the Younger (an example is at Staatsgalerie Aschaffenburg), Hendrick van Balen and Hans Jordaens III who painted the staffage in his landscapes.
