= Pieter Huys =

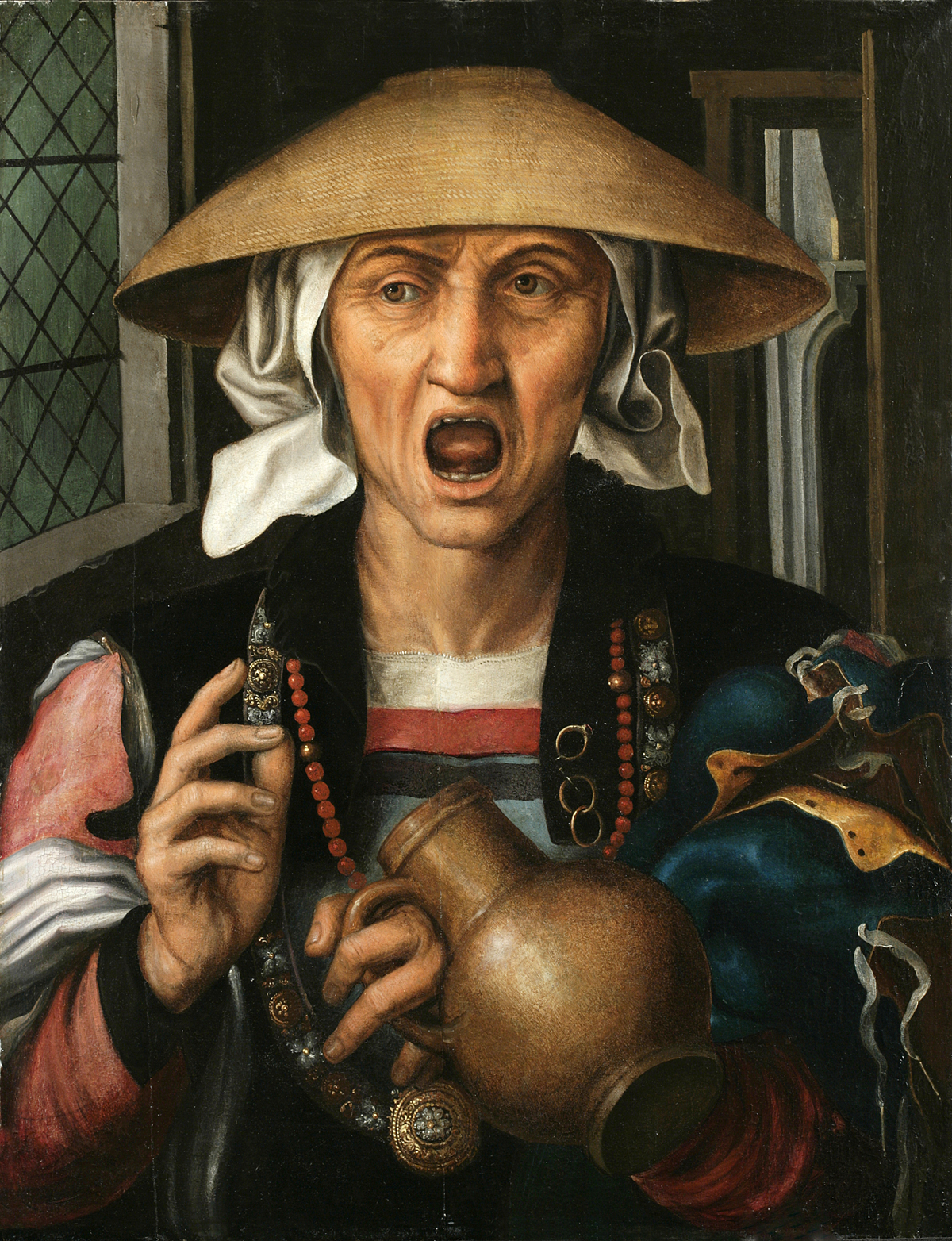
Woman Enraged

Pieter Huys (c.1519 – c.1584) was a Flemish Renaissance painter.

He is known of his early life, and though he was mostly active in Antwerp, his place of birth and death is not certain. He became a master in the Antwerp Guild of St. Luke in 1545, and his last dated work is from 1577. He is known as a follower of Jheronimus Bosch.

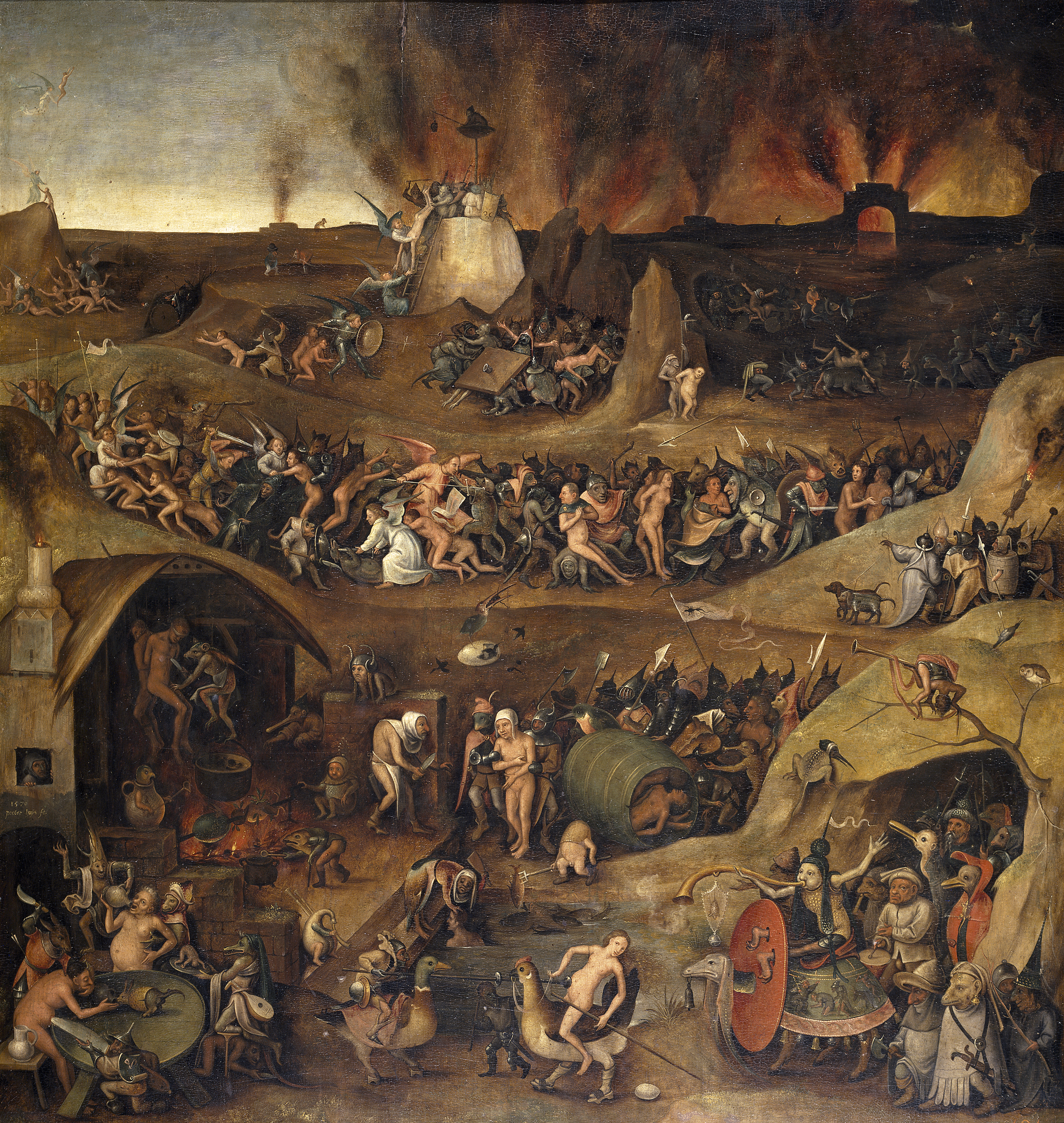
Inferno

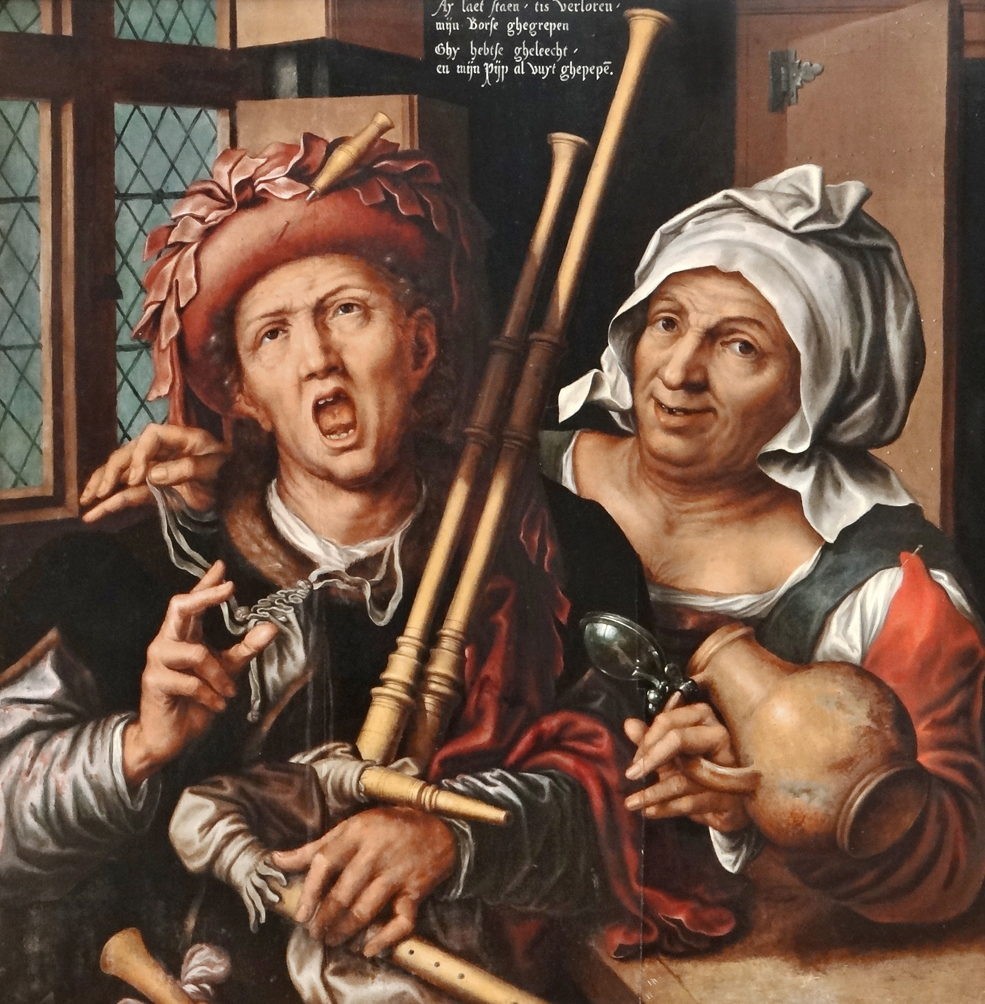
The Bagpiper and the Old Woman

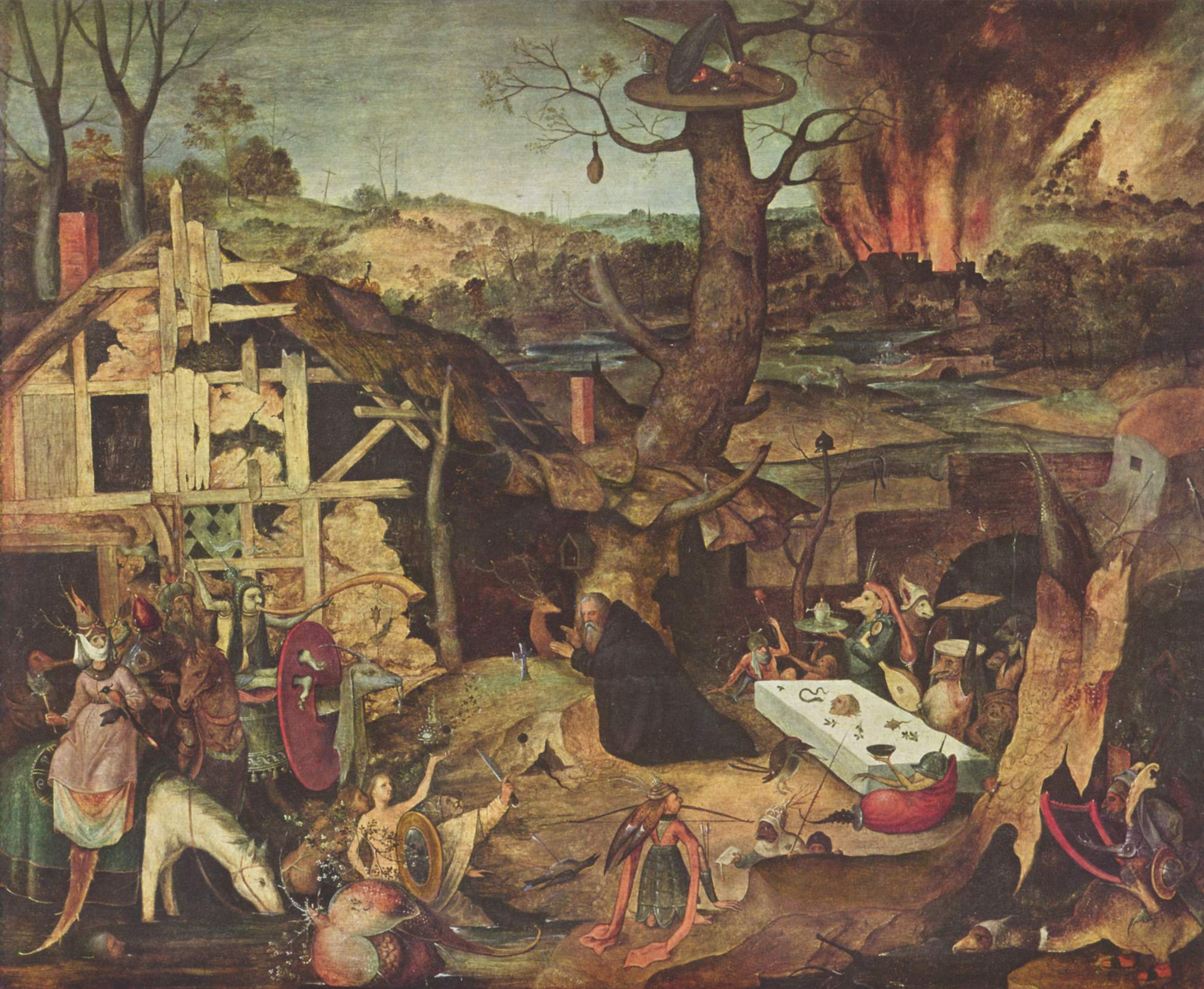
The temptations of Anthony
