= Devi Dja =

Indonesian-born American actress and dancer (1914–1989)

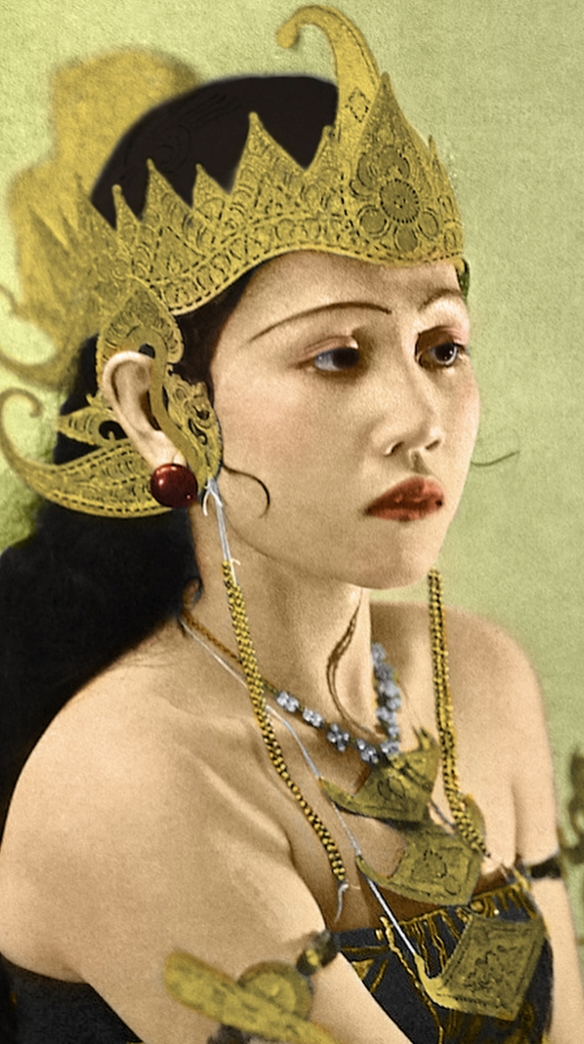
- Dja in 1938
- Born: Misria Dja; August 1, 1914; Sleman Regency, Special Region of Yogyakarta, Dutch East Indies
- Died: January 19, 1989 (aged 74); Los Angeles, California, U.S.
- Other names: Soetidjah; Miss Dja
- Citizenship: Indonesia; United States
- Occupations: Actress; dancer
- Years active: 1927–1989
- Spouses: Willy A. Piedro (m. 1930; died 1952) Acee Blue Eagle (divorced) Ali Assan (m. 1951; died 1985)
- Children: Ratna Assan
- Relatives: Ali Joego (brother-in-law)

Devi Dja (born Misria Dja; August 1, 1914 – January 19, 1989), better known as Miss Dja, was an Indonesian-born American actress, dancer, and singer. A member of the Dardanella Opera group, founded by Willy A. Piedro, who later became her husband. She moved with him to the United States around 1940, and remained there for the rest of her life as a professional entertainer, taking American citizenship.

== Life and career ==
=== 1914–1930: Childhood and early career ===
Devi Dja was born Misria Dja on August 1, 1914, in Sentul, a part of Sidoagung, the village in Godean, Sleman Regency, to Adiredjo from the Royal Palace of Yogyakarta, and Sriami from Sumenep. Some sources such as United States Immigration Service document stated her birthplace as Pandaan, a city in East Java near 60 km from south part of Surabaya, and the naturalization form in the United States in 1953 recorded Kali Baru, a district in Banyuwangi, as her birthplace which Dja also mentioned during her interview with Saeroen in the Pemandangan newspaper, in 1934. She had a younger sister, Sutijem, who later married Ali Joego and became an actress using the stage name Dewi Kusna. Her paternal grandfather, Satiran, was a soldier of the royal palace of Yogyakarta who fled after the rebellion of the followers of Prince Suryegalaga. In order to escape the rebellion, Satiran along with his family moved, busking, from village to village in East Java where Adiredjo later met with Sriami in Surabaya, and married her there. During Sriami's pregnancy, she often argued with her father-in-law and later moved away with her husband to give birth to Dja. Satiran sent Dja to live with her paternal grandparents and she was often sick as a toddler. Her birth name was changed by her grandfather to Soetidjah, a common practice in Javanese culture.

Dja's childhood was spent moving from village to village with her grandparents. At the age of five, she moved to Pandaan to live with her parent and did not receive a proper education. She later returned to live with her grandparents in Kali Baru and with the help of an Arab man and Dutch women, Dja's grandfather established a troupe called Stambul Pak Adi in the 1920s. This troupe was popular in Bondowoso, Jember, and Banyuwangi. Dja later joined the troupe as a dancer and singer using the stage name Soetidjah (or Dja).

=== 1930: Dardanella ===
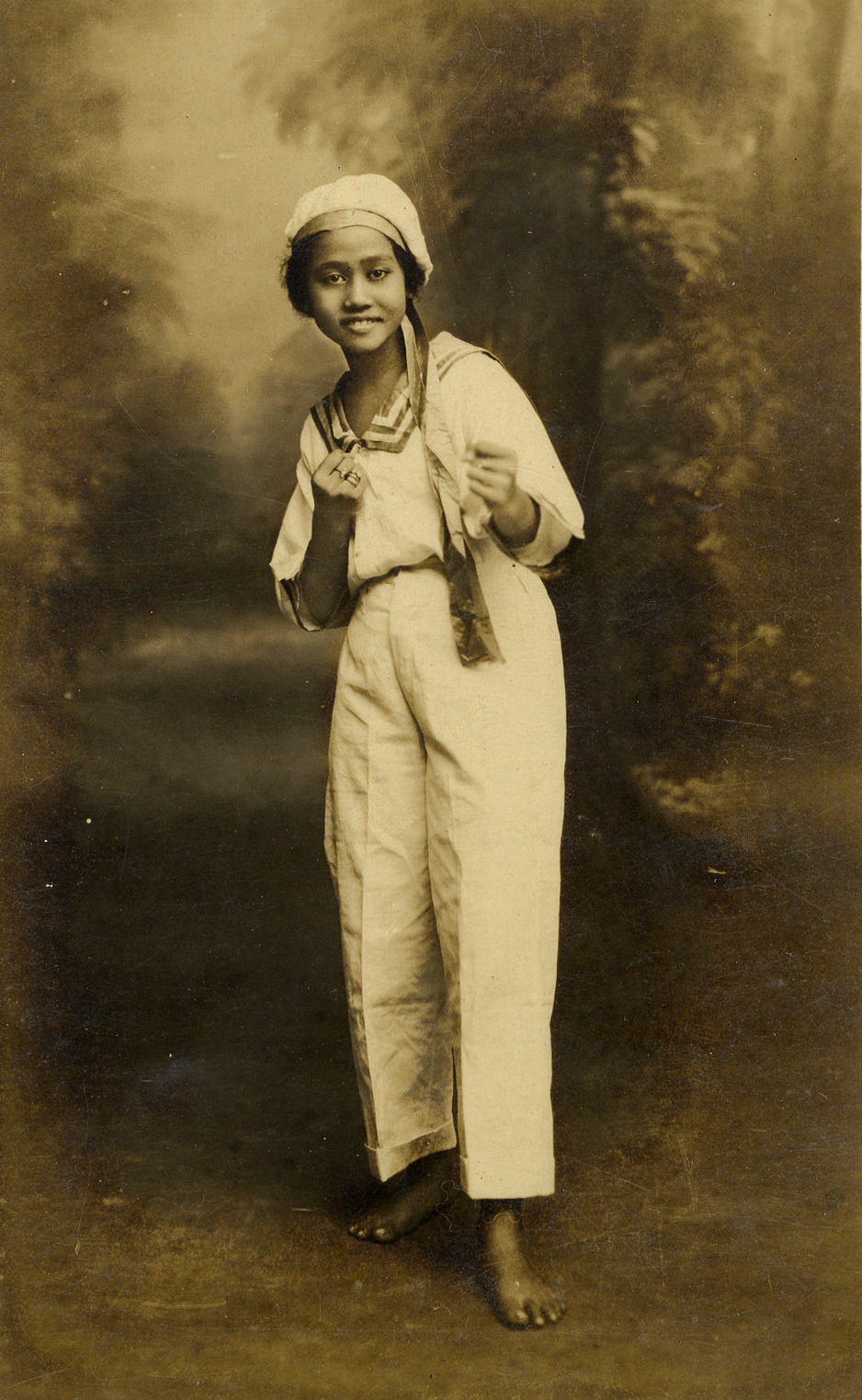
Dja in a studio photograph in c. 1930

During her time with her grandfather's troupe in Rogojampi, Banyuwangi, in early 1927, she met Willy A. Piedro (born Willy Klimanoff), a Penang-born actor of Russian descent, who was the lead of the Malay Opera Dardanella troupe and often saw her perform. He invited Dja to joined in his troupe after seeing her singing Kopi Susu on stage, and later proposed marriage with the help of the head of Rogojampi District and Dja's grandfather. Dja's first performance with Dardanella was in Makassar on December 2, 1927, when she was 13 years old in a play titled Boenga Roos dari Serang by Hoo Tjong Leon as an extra, where she portrayed Hoo's daughter, Kiem Nio. They continued to perform in Ambon, Ternate, and Manado, in March 1928. After their last performance in Surabaya, they traveled to Banjarmasin and performed The Sheik of Arabia, which resulted in many positive reviews from the Bintang Borneo newspaper and continued to perform in Balikpapan and Samarinda from May until August 1928. They returned to Java in October 1928 and began their tour again in Surabaya where Dja took a break from performance. On October 30, she appeared in The Rose of Serang in Semarang as Hoo's daughter and received a positive response from Djawa-Tengah newspaper. On November 24, Dja recorded songs she sang for Beka, a vinyl record company from Germany. Her song "Toekang Satee" which she sang along with Miss Riboet II was released by Behn, Meyer & Co.

On January 21, 1929, after performed in Magelang, Dja performed for the first time in Yogyakarta at the North square of Sri Sultan's palace by staging The Sheik. During her stay in Yogyakarta, she also staged several plays adapted from American films, such as The Three Musketeers, The Thief of Baghdad, The Son of Zorro, and Count de Monte Christo, as well as several plays from social life in the Dutch East Indies, such as Kembangnja Kota Fort de Kock, Lily dari Tjikampek, and Setangan Berloemoeran Darah, until February 20. In late February and early March, Dja performed in Surakarta at the north square of the Susuhunan Palace.

In 1930, Dja, who often appeared in plays as an extra, was asked to replace the lead actress who had fallen ill. The Sin Jit Po daily newspaper praised her performance and described the extra as gorgeous which resulted in attention and applause from public. By 1931, she was appearing prominently in theatrical posters as "Miss Dja: Dardanella's Sweet Seventeen". By this time, the Dardanella was booming, with the troupe grown to 150 members, and made its first trip outside Indonesia, to Singapore. In the mid-1930s, it traveled to China and played in several cities. This was followed with a visit to Rangoon and India, where, in May 1937, Dja danced in the presence of Jawaharlal Nehru, the future prime minister. Continuing west, with the number of members declining along the way, Dardanella performed in Turkey, Paris, Morocco, and Germany. Dja became known as the Pavlova of the Orient, after the ballerina, Anna Pavlova.

The remaining players were on the last voyage of the SS Rotterdam out of the Netherlands in 1939. In New York City, they changed their name to "Devi Dja's Bali and Java Cultural Dancers", performing in restaurants in the city. Following the outbreak of World War II and the occupation of Indonesia by Japanese troops, they were unable to return home and were effectively stuck in the US. At the end of the war, she and her husband opened a nightclub in Chicago, called the Sarong Room, but it burned down in 1946. Klimanoff died in Chicago in 1952.

In 1947, Dja met Sutan Sjahrir who, as prime minister, was leading the Indonesian delegation to the United Nations in New York to fight for international recognition of Indonesia's independence. He introduced her to the American public as an ambassador for Indonesian culture, resulting in her name becoming increasingly known in the US. In 1951, she became an American citizen, believed to be the first Indonesian woman to be naturalized. This might have been done in order to protect her from possible deportation in light of her friendship with the Indonesian communist, Lari Bogk, who had been in the US supporting Indonesian seamen and port workers who were refusing to load supplies destined for the Dutch East Indies colonial government. After her husband's death, she continued to perform, together with the few remaining Dardanella group members.

She married Acee Blue Eagle, a Native American artist, but the marriage was short-lived, allegedly because he did not like her continuing to interact with Indonesians in the US. After they divorced, she moved to Los Angeles, but failed to break into the movie industry, obtaining only a few bit parts, despite establishing friendships with stars such as Greta Garbo, Gary Cooper, Bob Hope, Dorothy Lamour, and Bing Crosby. Her main difficulty in getting employment was her poor spoken English. She then married an Indonesian, Ali Assan, six years her junior, with whom she had a daughter, Ratna Assan in 1954. Again, the marriage was short-lived.

Dja continued to work in California, performing and teaching Indonesian dancing, for a time having her own dance school in the Vermont area of Los Angeles. She was represented by the agent Raymond D. Bowman who specialized in "world music" and jazz performers. When the first Indonesia president, Sukarno, visited the US she met with him and on a visit to Indonesia she was received by him at the State Palace. He tried to persuade her to give up her US citizenship, but this would have made work in the US difficult. In 1960, she teamed up with modern dance pioneer, Ruth St. Denis, to present the first Balinese shadow puppet play in the United States.

== Filmography ==
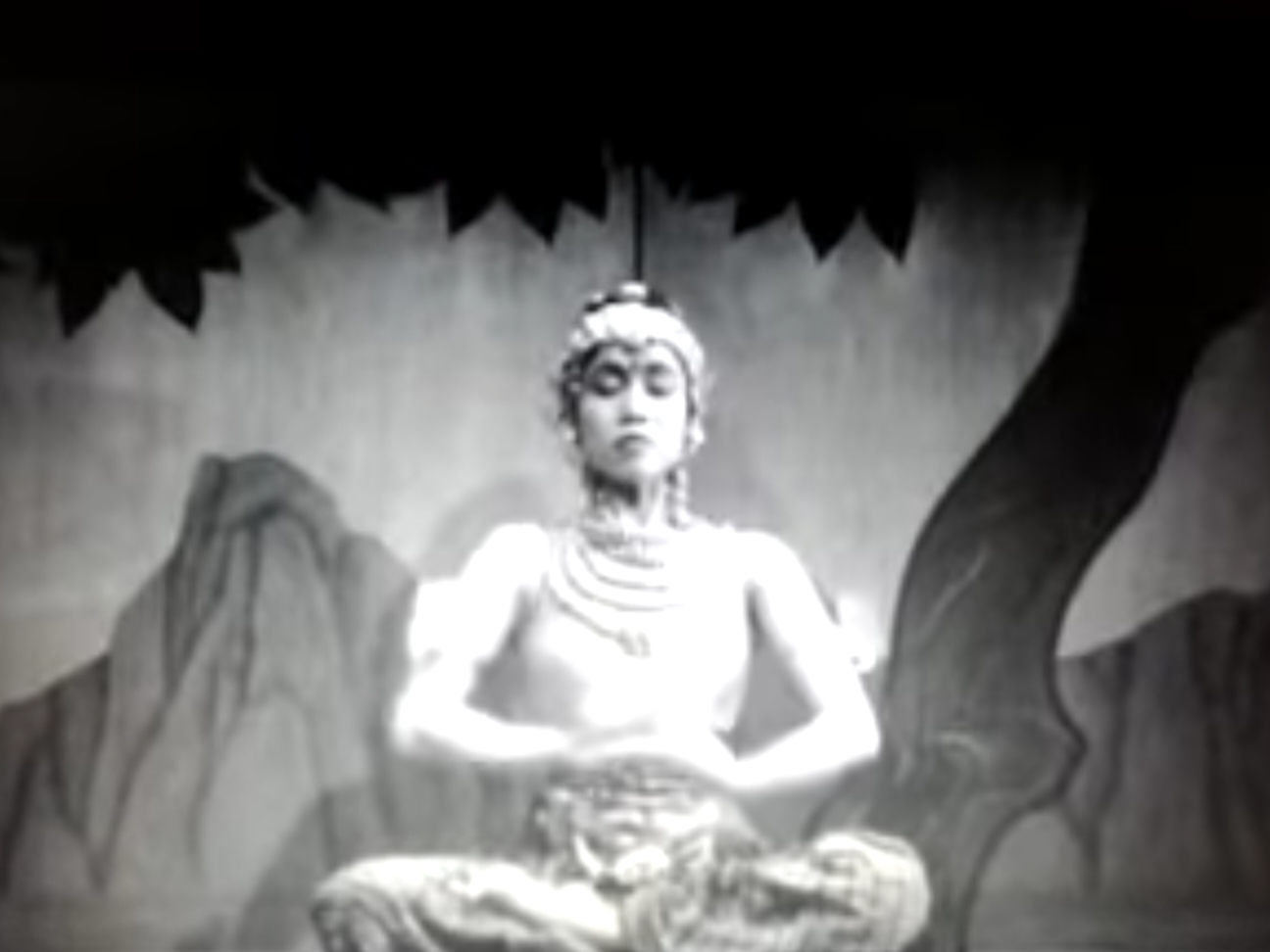
Dja in a scene from The Picture of Dorian Gray (1945)

Year	Film	Role	Notes
1937	Dr. Samsi	Soekasih	
1940	Road to Singapore	Native Girl	Uncredited
1942	The Moon and Sixpence	Dancer	Technical Advisor
1942	Road to Morocco	Dancer	Uncredited
1945	The Picture of Dorian Gray	Lead Dancer	
1949	Beyond the Forest	Dancer	Uncredited
1950	Three Came Home	Ah Yin	Uncredited
1950	Cargo to Capetown	Dancer	Uncredited
1952	Road to Bali	Dancer	Uncredited

== Death and legacy ==
Dja died at Northridge Hospital in Northridge, Los Angeles, on January 19, 1989, from cancer at the age of 74. She was buried in Forest Lawn Memorial Park (Hollywood Hills). Two books have been written about her: Gelombang Hidupku: Dewi Dja dari Dardanella (My Life's Wave: Devi Dja of Dardanella) by Ramadhan Karta Hadimadja, and Standing Ovations: Devi Dja, Woman of Java by Leona Merrin. Both biographies are based on interviews with Dja.

== See also ==
- List of dancers

== Citations ==
=== Works cited ===
- Erkelens, Jaap (2022). Dardanella: Perintis Teater Indonesia Modern, Duta Kesenian Indonesia Melanglang Buana (in Indonesian). Penerbit Buku Kompas. ISBN 978-623-346-197-9.
