= The Private Affairs of Bel Ami =

1947 film by Albert Lewin

- Directed by: Albert Lewin
- Screenplay by: Albert Lewin
- Based on: Bel Ami; 1885 novel by Guy de Maupassant
- Produced by: David L. Loew
- Starring: George Sanders; Angela Lansbury; Ann Dvorak
- Cinematography: Russell Metty
- Edited by: Albrecht Joseph
- Music by: Darius Milhaud
- Production company: David L. Loew-Albert Lewin
- Distributed by: United Artists
- Release date: April 25, 1947
- Running time: 112 minutes
- Country: United States
- Language: English

The Private Affairs of Bel Ami is a 1947 American drama film directed by Albert Lewin. The film stars George Sanders as a ruthless cad who uses women to rise in Parisian society, co-starring Angela Lansbury and Ann Dvorak. It is based on the 1885 Guy de Maupassant novel Bel Ami. The film had a 1946 premiere in Paris, Texas. The score is by Darius Milhaud.

== Plot ==
In Paris in 1880, Georges Duroy, an ex-soldier working as a poorly paid clerk, encounters his former comrade-in-arms, sickly journalist Charles Forestier. Rachel, already rebuffed once by Georges, sits down at their cafe table. After Georges rudely dismisses her, Charles tells him the quickest way to better himself in Paris is by using his charms on women. Charles then suggests he seek a vacancy at his newspaper, La Vie Française, despite having no writing experience. Georges then takes Charles' advice and goes to Rachel who is a dancer.

He meets pretty young widow Clotilde de Marelle at a dinner party hosted by Charles and his wife. She has an interest in going dancing but says no male acquaintance will take her. Charles' publisher is also a guest; he asks Georges for a sample article by the next day. Georges also meets 15-year-old daughter Suzanne Walter, who feels restricted by her parents. Georges has difficulty creating his writing sample, so he asks Charles for assistance. Charles sends him to see his wife Madeleine; she helps him land the job. She also suggests he call on Clotilde.

He takes Clotilde dancing at a raucous nightspot. The singer there sings "Bel Ami", which is about a scoundrel. Clotilde calls Georges Bel Ami; he promises to live up (or down) to that name. While they are out one night, Rachel spots them and Georges snubs her. She makes a scene. Afterward, Clotilde writes Georges a letter in which she confesses she loves him so much that there is nothing she cannot forgive him.

At work, Charles states he has trained Georges to be his successor; his health is deteriorating. Georges tells Madeleine that he has fallen a little in love with her. She wants only to remain his friend. Georges then tells her of his idea: to write a gossip column, Echoes, to be filled with innuendo and rumors that might in time influence politics and the stock exchange. Madeleine thinks this is a magnificent plan.

At a gathering where Georges and Laroche-Mathieu insult one another, Georges meets the now "grown-up" Suzanne (she is 16). The girl's mother says she is very taken by Georges.

Clotilde informs him that the wealthy, virtuous Jacques Rival has proposed to her, but that she wants to marry Georges. He tells her that he must either conquer Paris or be conquered. He states his heart tells him that he could be happy with her, but he has not listened to it "in a long time."

After Charles dies, Georges proposes to Madeleine. She accepts, but insists it be a marriage of equals. The Echoes column is a great success. Georges becomes powerful, and Madeleine presides over an influential salon. Later, colleagues comment on the similarity of Georges' articles to Charles'; the implication being that Madeleine is the true writer. But Georges is pleased his column has helped overthrow the cabinet and made Laroche-Mathieu minister for foreign affairs.

Georges only fails to seduce the wife of the blind pianist he met at the first dinner party. He disparages her husband as being unable to appreciate her beauty, but the wife tells Georges off.

Georges then juggles the affections of Madeleine and Clotilde, and those of Madame Walter, a married woman of virtuous reputation. Georges flatters her and later she gives him some useful news. Her husband and Laroche-Mathieu have fed him false information; the government is about to seize Morocco, contrary to what he has written in his column. The schemers will benefit financially from their manipulation of him. Mme Walters suggests he invest with her and make a profit. She kneels by him and winds her hair around his jacket cuff buttons.

Clotilde later finds the hairs and knows they are not Madeleine's. She is upset he is not even faithful to Madeleine and her, but Georges reads from a letter Clotilde once sent him saying she would always love him regardless of any cruelty and she would hide her jealousy.

Madeleine inherits a fortune from a male friend and Georges says this will humiliate him as it implies she and the man were lovers. In order to fend off gossip he wants Madeleine to sign over half the money to him and for them to say their friend left his fortune equally to both of them. Madeleine agrees.

The Walters invite the Duroys to their home to a viewing of a celebrated and costly painting (it is boldly coloured and full of evil-looking creatures). Suzanne, now a sought-after heiress, is delighted to see him. Seeing Madeleine and Laroche-Mathieu conversing at the gathering gives Georges an idea. Laroche-Mathieu is attracted to Madeleine, so he asks her to lead the foreign minister on to gain information and ensure that he does not deceive Georges again, at least that is what he tells her. He then uses this as grounds for divorce, so he can marry Suzanne. Her father is outraged, and her mother aghast. Upon further consideration, however, and for his daughter's happiness, he gives his consent. This is too much for Clotilde to stand.

According to French law, a person can appropriate a noble name if there are no known survivors. Georges does just that. Madame Walter, however, locates Philippe de Cantel, the last descendant, though too late. He challenges Georges to a duel, two weeks before his marriage. Before the duel, Georges professes to Clotilde that there are only two people he loves: her and her young daughter. Clotilde goes to the Walters to try to stop the duel, but the two men fatally shoot each other. Just before he dies, Georges regrets not being happy with Clotilde.

== Cast ==
- George Sanders as Georges Duroy
- Angela Lansbury as Clotilde de Marelle
- Ann Dvorak as Madeleine Forestier
- John Carradine as Charles Forestier
- Susan Douglas Rubeš as Suzanne Walter (as Susan Douglas)
- Hugo Haas as Monsieur Walter
- Warren William as Laroche-Mathieu
- Frances Dee as Marie de Varenne
- Albert Bassermann as Jacques Rival
- Marie Wilson as Rachel
- Katherine Emery as Madame Walter
- Richard Fraser as Philippe de Cantel
- John Good as Paul de Cazolles
- David Bond as Norbert de Varenne
- Leonard Mudie as Potin
- Judy Cook as Hortense
- Karolyn Grimes as Laurine
- Jean Del Val as Commissioner
- Olaf Hytten as Keeper of the Seals
- Lumsden Hare as Mayor of Canteleu
- Betty Fairfax as Louise
- C. Montague Shaw as Surgeon
- Larry Steers as Second Surgeon
- Gloria Grafton as Singer
- Wyndham Standing as Count de Vaudrec

== Production ==
The film was the swan song of the actor Warren William due to his health continuing to deteriorate. He was unable to work for most of 1947, the year the filming of The Private Affairs of Bel Ami finished. This was the first role of Susan Douglas Rubeš who had to sign a seven-year contract or else she could not act in any more films. Signing actors and actresses for seven years was a common thing for studios to do at the time. Due to restrictions imposed by the Motion Picture Production Code, certain scenes needed to be censored.

The 1945 painting The Temptation of St. Anthony by Max Ernst was shown on-screen, a brief splash of color in an otherwise black-and-white film, having been the winner of a contest between invited artists; Ivan Albright, Eugene Berman, Leonora Carrington, Salvador Dalí, Paul Delvaux, Dorothea Tanning, Leonor Fini, Louis Guglielmi, Horace Pippin, Abraham Rattner, Stanley Spencer and Ernst to create a work on the theme. Fini did not produce a painting, but the others were paid $500 for their submissions, with an additional $2,500 prize for the winner. Film critic Bosley Crowther condemned the painting as "downright nauseous" but a contemporary review in Variety said it was "flashed on the screen ... in brilliant Technicolor for good effect".

== Reception ==
Bosley Crowther, critic for The New York Times, panned the movie, stating, "it is incredible that a picture could be made from a Guy de Maupassant novel and be as tiresome as this." He also complained that "everybody, from Mr. Sanders right on down through the whole list of love-laden ladies and fancifully costumed gents, acts as posily and pompously as they are compelled to talk." A 1946 Variety review stated, "Confronted with the old problem of cleaning up a classic novel to conform to strict censorship codes, the production outfit has come up with a scrubbed-face version of the complete scoundrel depicted in Guy de Maupassant's novel Private Affairs of Bel Ami." Variety also said that the cast was "exceptionally strong" and praised the score and camerawork. The author John Strangeland, who wrote a book about Warren William, said that the film is a "tiresome bore" and "terribly dry".

== Home media ==
The Private Affairs of Bel Ami was released on VHS in 1991. Steve Daly wrote in a 1991 Entertainment Weekly article that "the video release of this film is happy news for fans of George Sanders' particular brand of cinematic spleen."

== See also ==
- The Temptation of St. Anthony (Carrington)
- The Temptation of St. Anthony (Dalí)
