= Joos van Craesbeeck =

Flemish painter and baker (c. 1605/06 – c. 1660)

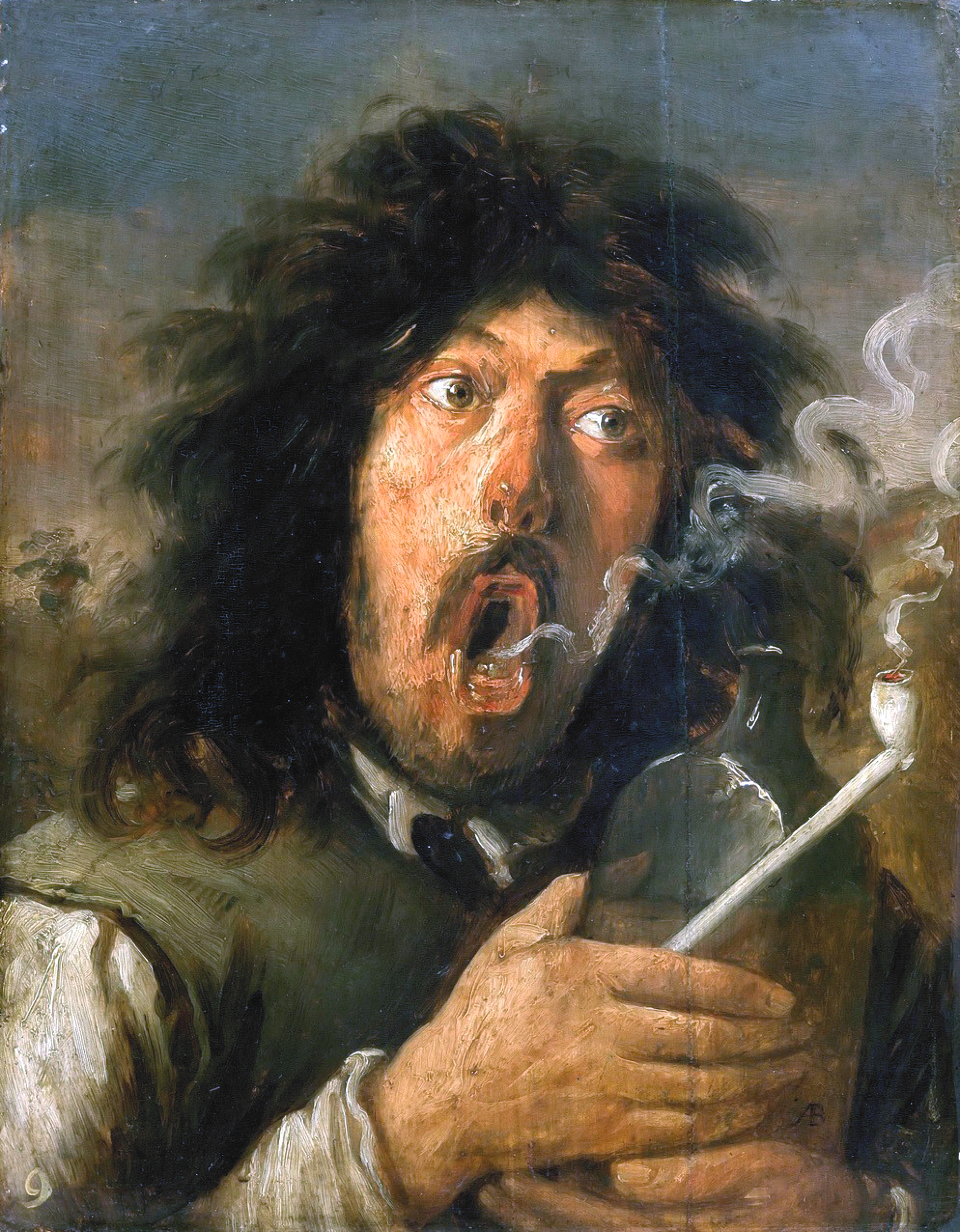
The Smoker, a presumed self portrait of van Craesbeek, 1635-36

Joos van Craesbeeck (c. 1605/06 – c. 1660) was a Flemish baker and a painter who played an important role in the development of Flemish genre painting in the mid-17th century through his tavern scenes and dissolute portraits. His genre scenes depict low-life figures as well as scenes of middle-class people. He created a few religiously themed compositions.

== Life ==
Joos van Craesbeeck was born in Neerlinter (now a village in Flemish Brabant, Belgium). His father was also called Joos and is believed to have been a baker. His mother's name was Gertruid van Callenborch. In 1630 or 1631 Joos van Craesbeeck married Johanna Tielens. His wife's father was a baker but her family also counted artists among its members: the landscape painter Jan Tielens was her uncle while two of her uncles on her mother's side were the sculptors Melchior and Caspar Grison.

The Tielens family was also responsible for the operation of the bakery in Antwerp Citadel. When the painter Adriaen Brouwer was imprisoned in the citadel, van Craesbeeck likely got to know him. Based on information provided by contemporary Flemish biographer Cornelis de Bie in his book Het Gulden Cabinet van Craesbeeck is believed to have become Brouwer's pupil and best friend. Their relationship was described by de Bie as 'Soo d’oude songhen, soo pypen de jonghen' (As the old ones sang, so the young ones chirp'). The stylistic similarities of van Craesbeeck's early work with that of Brouwer seems to corroborate such pupilage.

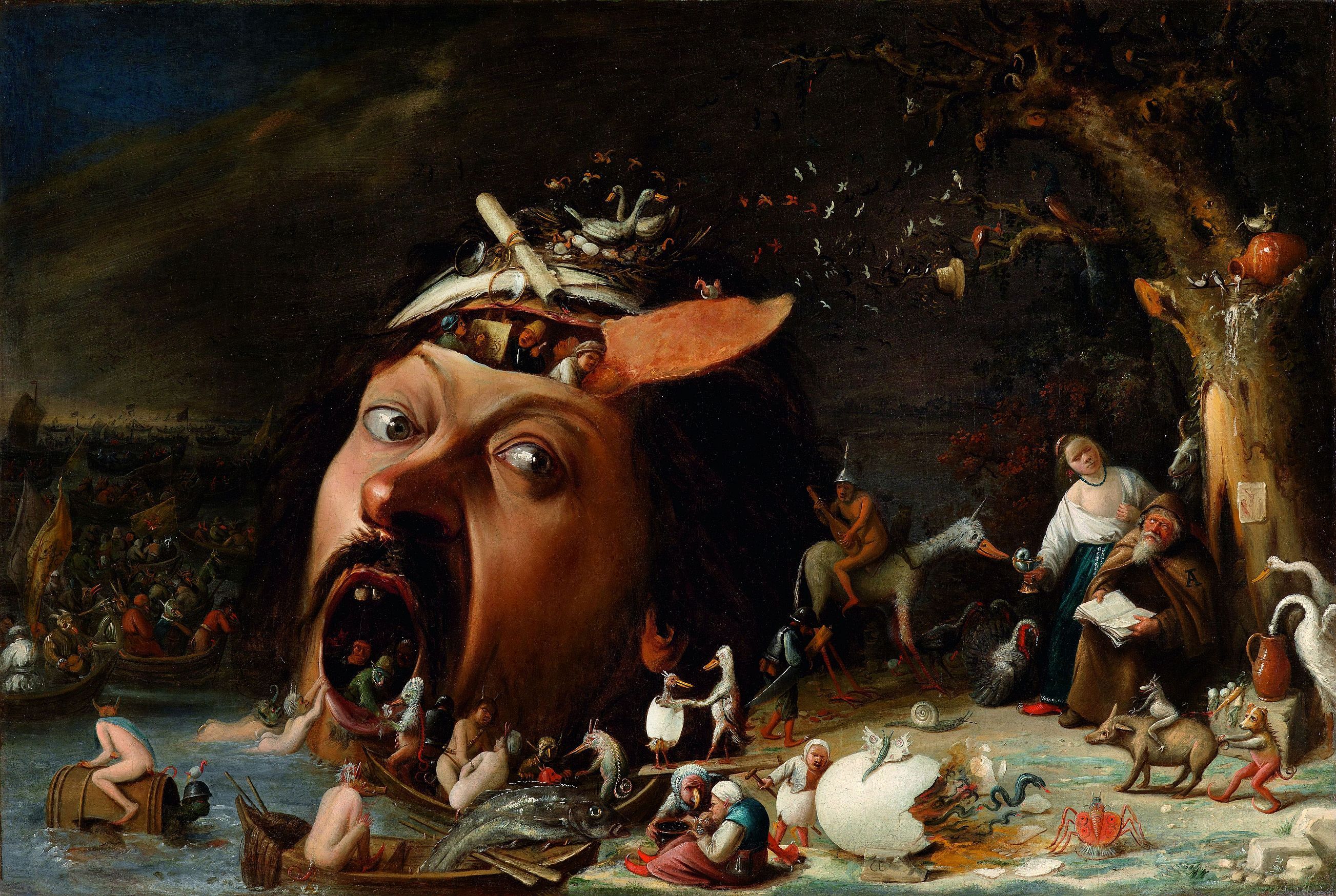
The Temptation of St. Anthony, c. 1650

Van Craesbeeck became a master in Antwerp's Guild of Saint Luke in 1633–1634 as a baker and painter. In 1637 he was widowed and obtained an inheritance. That year he is recorded as the owner of a new house with a bakery in Antwerp. From this time onwards he was able to dedicate himself full-time to painting.

The movements of van Craesbeek between 1637 and 1651, the year he became master in the Brussels Guild of Saint Luke are not clear. It is likely that his move to Brussels was linked to that of David Teniers the Younger who settled in Brussels on 7 September 1650. In 1653, Adriaen Rombouts was his pupil. According to the artist biographer Jacob Campo Weyerman, Daniël Boone was also his pupil but there is no independent evidence for such apprenticeship.

The death date of van Craesbeeck is not known with certainty but it must be situated between 1660 and 1661 since in 1660 a Lucas Viters was registered as his pupil at the Guild and a year later Cornelis de Bie reported him as deceased.

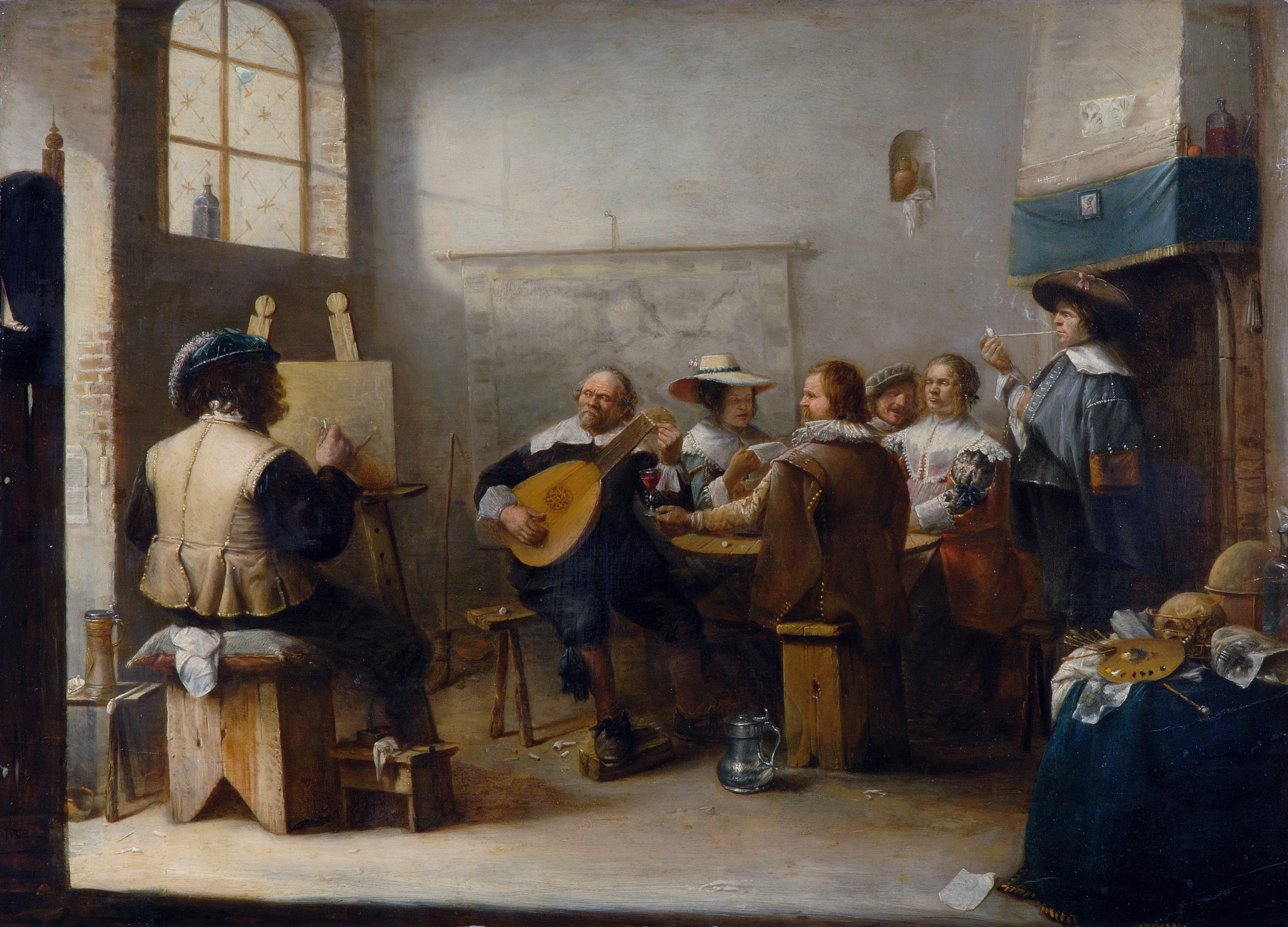
The Painter’s Studio, 1655

== Work ==
=== Evolution ===
Joos van Craesbeeck painted mainly genre scenes and a few religiously themed compositions. His genre scenes depict low-life figures as well as scenes of middle-class people. The chronology of his work is difficult to establish since only one painting, the now missing Self-portrait in front of a Mirror, is signed. In addition to the one painting signed with his full name, there are about 30 other paintings with the monogram cb or jvcb. Despite the difficulty of dating his paintings, it is believed that his earliest works are largely indebted to the subject matter and style of Brouwer. In these early works he relied on the types of Brouwers and he followed Brouwer's palette in its subtle harmonies with occasional gleaming highlights. Like Brouwer he applied colour very thinly leaving parts of the ground visible.

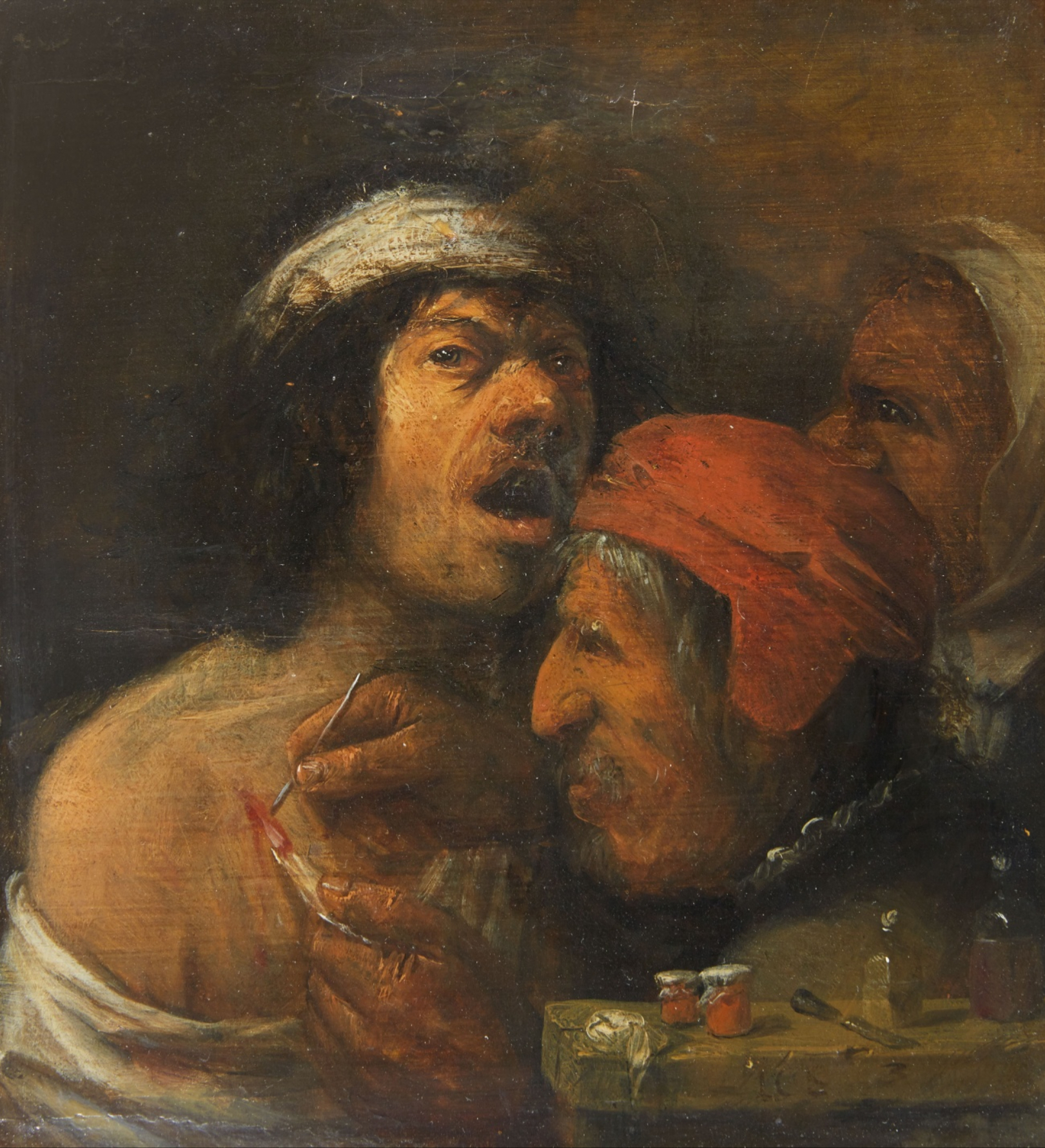
At the Surgeon's, possibly a self-portrait

After Brouwer's death in 1638 van Craesbeeck turned to other artists for inspiration and borrowed ideas from contemporary Dutch painters. Antwerp painters remained, however, his main source of inspiration. He was able to find his own individual interpretation of the everyday subjects, which formed the bulk of his output. His palette became dominated by browns and greys.

In a still later phase when he was a resident of Brussels, he painted his mature work, which was largely independent of Brouwer. A set of works from this period is characterized by its vivid colours and the use of his own repertory of figures: bearded men with flat or fur-decked caps, women with white bonnets or conspicuous straw hats.

=== Tronies ===
His master Brouwer played an important role in the development of the genre of the 'tronie'. The term tronie typically refers to figure studies not intended to depict an identifiable person, but rather to investigate various forms of facial expression. Tronies are thus a form of genre painting in a portrait format. Van Craesbeeck was a talented practitioner of this genre.

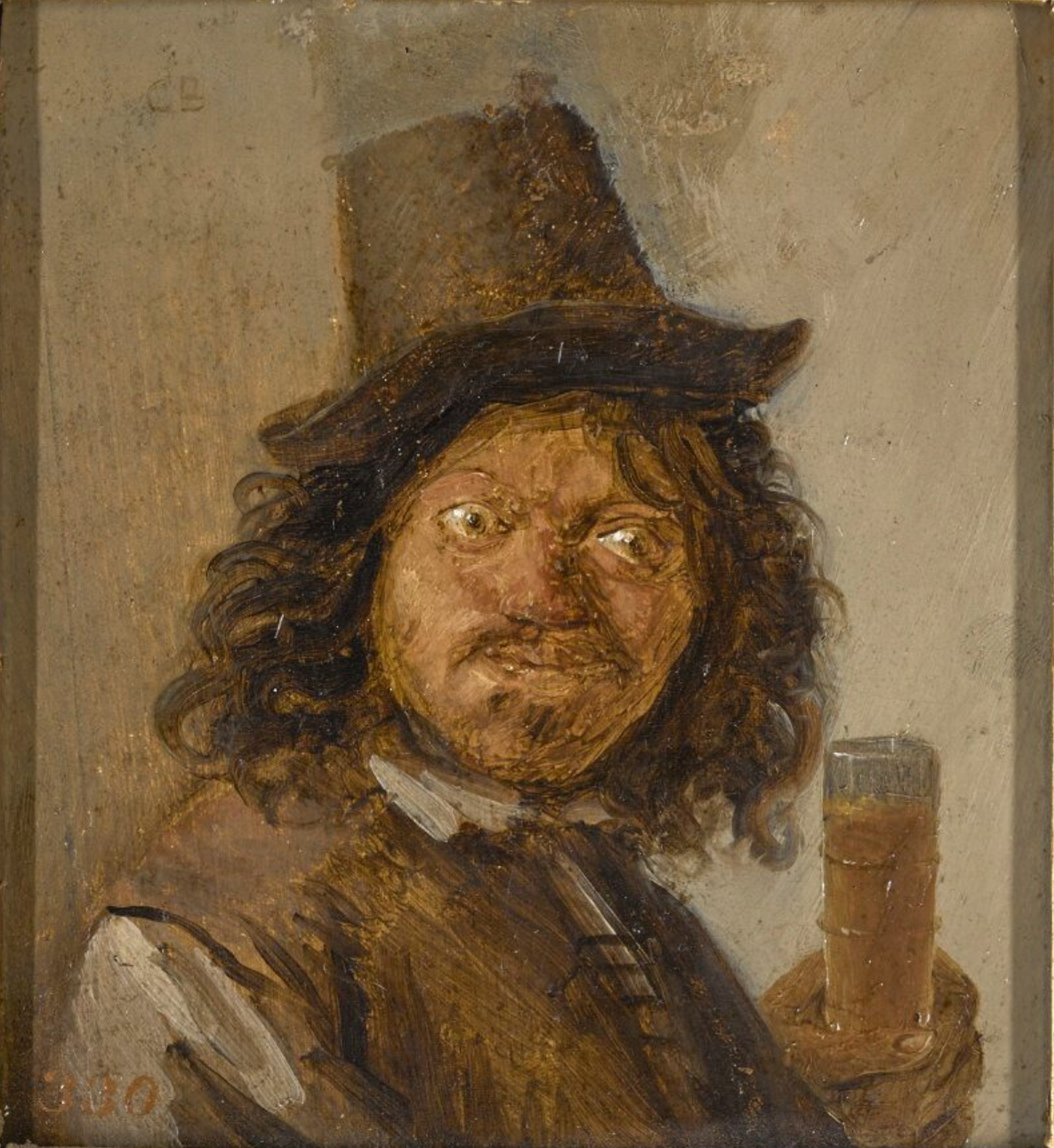
Portrait of a man clasping a drink

Many of his tronies are in fact self-portraits. He painted at least five presumed self-portraits in which he depicts himself in a 'dissolute' manner. The dissolute self-portrait was a form of self representation of artists that arose in Dutch and Flemish genre painting in the 17th century. It was an inversion of the Renaissance ideal of the 'pictor doctus', which regarded the artist as an intellectual and gentleman. This ideal was replaced by the new model of the prodigal artist characterized by his creative inspiration and talents. These self-portraits aimed to emphasize the artists' dissolute nature by creating associations with traditional moral themes such as the Five Senses and the Prodigal Son in the tavern. Van Craesbeeck painted himself four times in low-life guises. These self-portraits can also be regarded as tronies, since they depict the artist with exaggerated expressions, and often represent one of the five senses.

In his self-portraits, van Craesbeeck typically represented the sense of 'taste', which he expressed by painting himself as a drinker or a smoker. An example is The Smoker in the Louvre Museum. Most frequently he depicted himself as a drinker as in the Self-Portrait as a Drinker. This painting shows him grinning, with bulging eyes, untamed hair and dressed in peasant's clothes. He is clutching a full glass of wine. The rough style of these self-portraits is typical for the peasant vernacular of the genre. His lively, boorish expressions show his deep understanding of the peasant character.

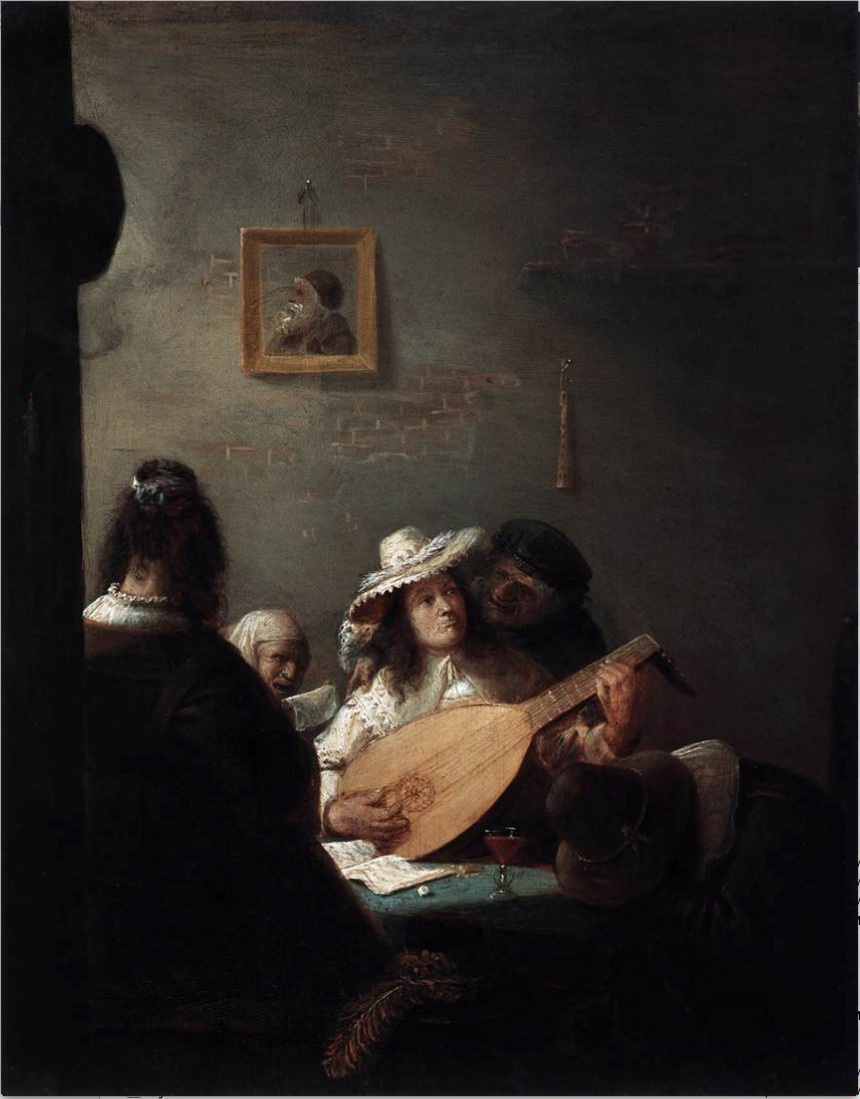
The Lute Player, 1655

Van Craesbeeck often developed on the theme of the five senses. His composition the Painter’s Studio is a tableau vivant showing figures symbolizing the Five Senses seated around a table while the artist is working at his easel. Each figure in the group represents one of the senses: a lute-player (Hearing), a man holding a wineglass (Taste), a man with a pipe (Smell), an intimate couple (Touch) and a woman reading (Sight).

=== Tavern scenes ===
He painted many tavern interiors. Some of these works are a reflection of the new themes that had been introduced in genre painting by the Northern followers of Caravaggio such as that of the musician.

An example is the Lute Player (Liechtenstein Museum), which shows two women entertaining a cavalier, who seems to have passed out with a full glass of wine in front of him. A flute hanging above the head of an old man leaning over the shoulder of the female lute player symbolises the man's thoughts. Van Craesbeeck modernized the pattern introduced by the Caravaggisti of showing figures seated around a table with those in front shown in silhouette by more full describing the interior space, showing the effect of the daylight and opting for a more vertical format.

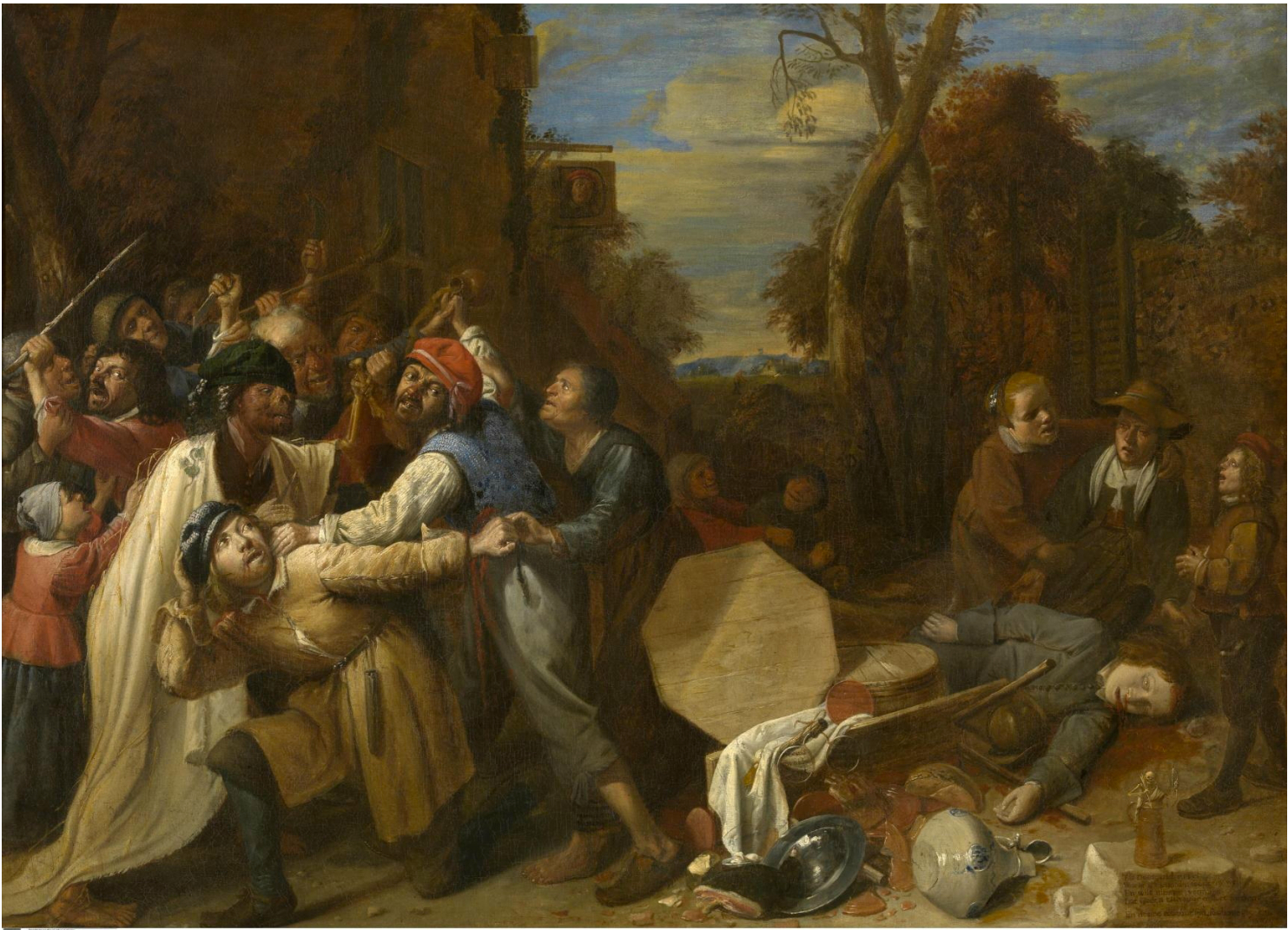
Death is Violent and Fast

Paintings such as Death is Violent and Fast are typical of his small, theatrical images of peasant brawls crowded with violent expressive figures already depicted by Brouwers. A tiny skeleton placed inside a tankard in the lower right foreground plays the role of death in the composition.

=== Guardroom scene ===
Van Craesbeeck also painted A guardroom interior with soldiers playing cards, which falls within the genre of the guardroom scene. A guardroom scene typically depicts an interior scene with officers and soldiers engaged in merrymaking. Guardroom scenes often included mercenaries and prostitutes dividing booty, harassing captives or indulging in other forms of reprehensible activities.

=== "Piskijken" ===
He also painted a few paintings in the subgenre referred to as "piskijken" ("pee looking"), which typically shows a woman with a doctor or quack performing a pregnancy test by looking at a sample of her urine. An example is The doctor's visit (Brukenthal Museum), which shows in the background a young woman who seems to have collapsed and is being comforted. In the foreground stands a person (a doctor or a quack?) who is holding up a vial with the woman's urine. A shadow of a foetus is visible in the vial, a sign that the young woman is pregnant.

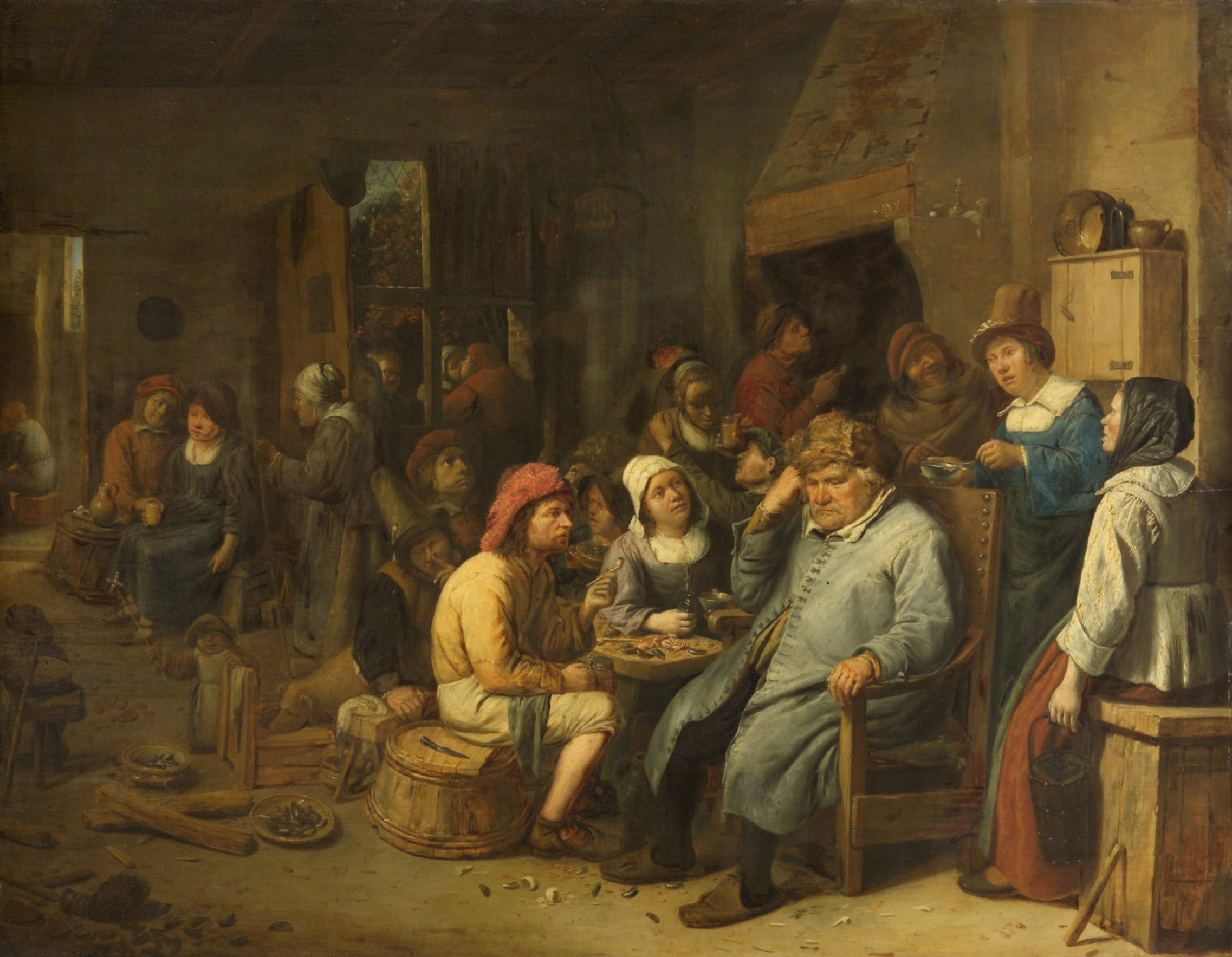
Company of Farmers in a Tavern
