= The Temptation of St. Anthony (Joos van Craesbeeck) =

Painting by Joos van Craesbeeck

The Temptation of Saint Anthony
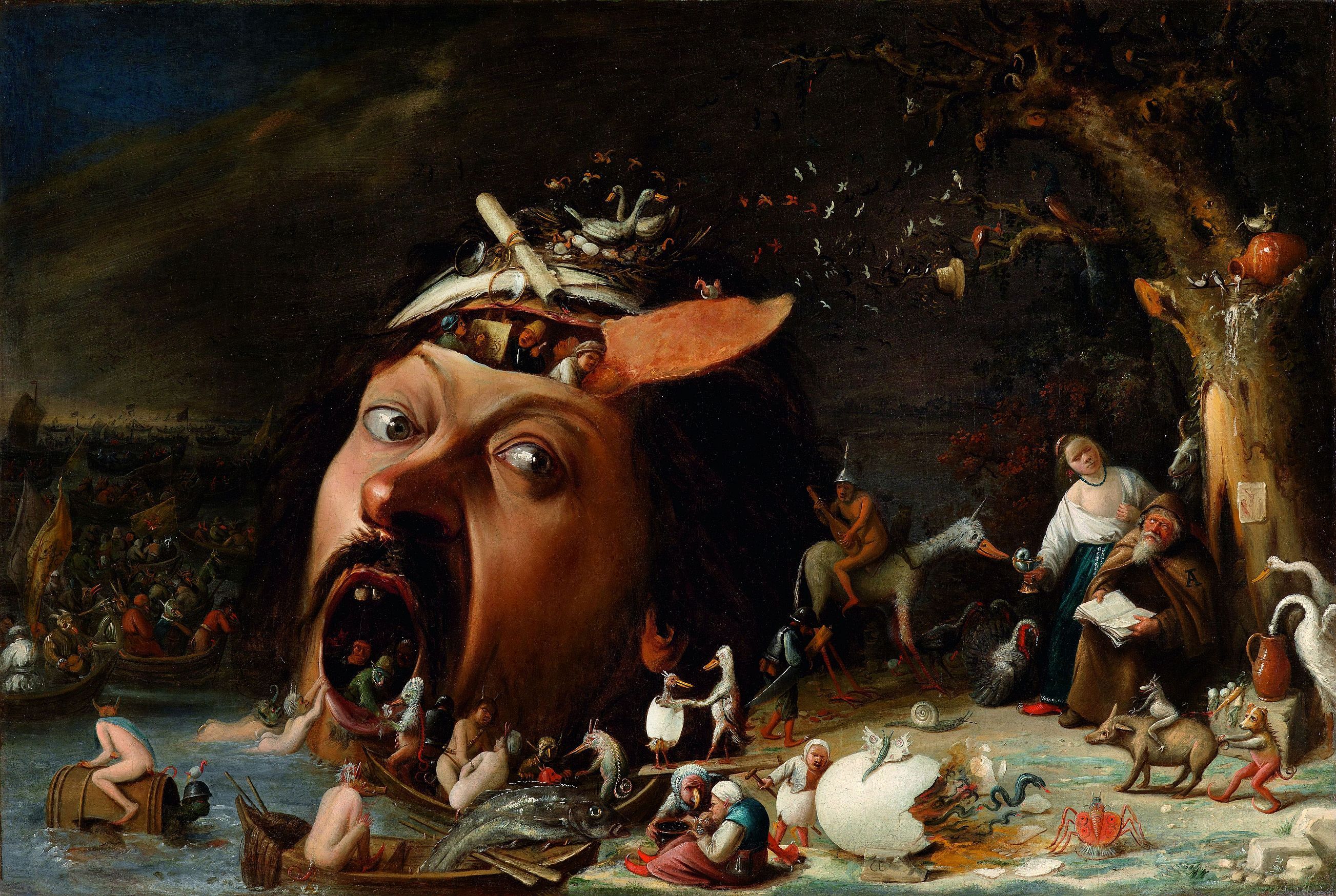
- Artist: Joos van Craesbeeck
- Year: c. 1650
- Medium: Oil on canvas
- Dimensions: 78 cm × 116 cm (31 in × 46 in)
- Location: Staatliche Kunsthalle Karlsruhe, Karlsruhe, Germany

The Temptation of Saint Anthony is a c. 1650 painting by the Flemish artist Joos van Craesbeeck.

== History ==
After the Netherlands split into Calvinist and Catholic areas, Flemish artists were keen to revive Catholic motifs and traditions through their paintings. Craesbeeck painted this oil on canvas c. 1650.

The painting was featured on the dust jacket of an edition of the novel Generation "П".

== Description ==
Artists and authors have long represented the temptation of St. Anthony in their art. Many homages to Hieronymus Bosch's Triptych of the Temptation of St. Anthony were made, of which Craesbeeck clearly draws inspiration.

A large screaming head dominates the painting, spewing forth many devils as a metaphor for evil thoughts given physical form. It has an open forehead which contains a miniature artist. This use of a human head as a container is likely derived from Bosch's iconography.

St. Anthony is seen in the front of the painting, sitting in a shelter and holding the Scriptures to fortify himself. The sea in front of him washes up a variety of evil spirits and other temptations.
