= Christ Appearing to Saint Anthony Abbot =

Painting by Annibale Carracci

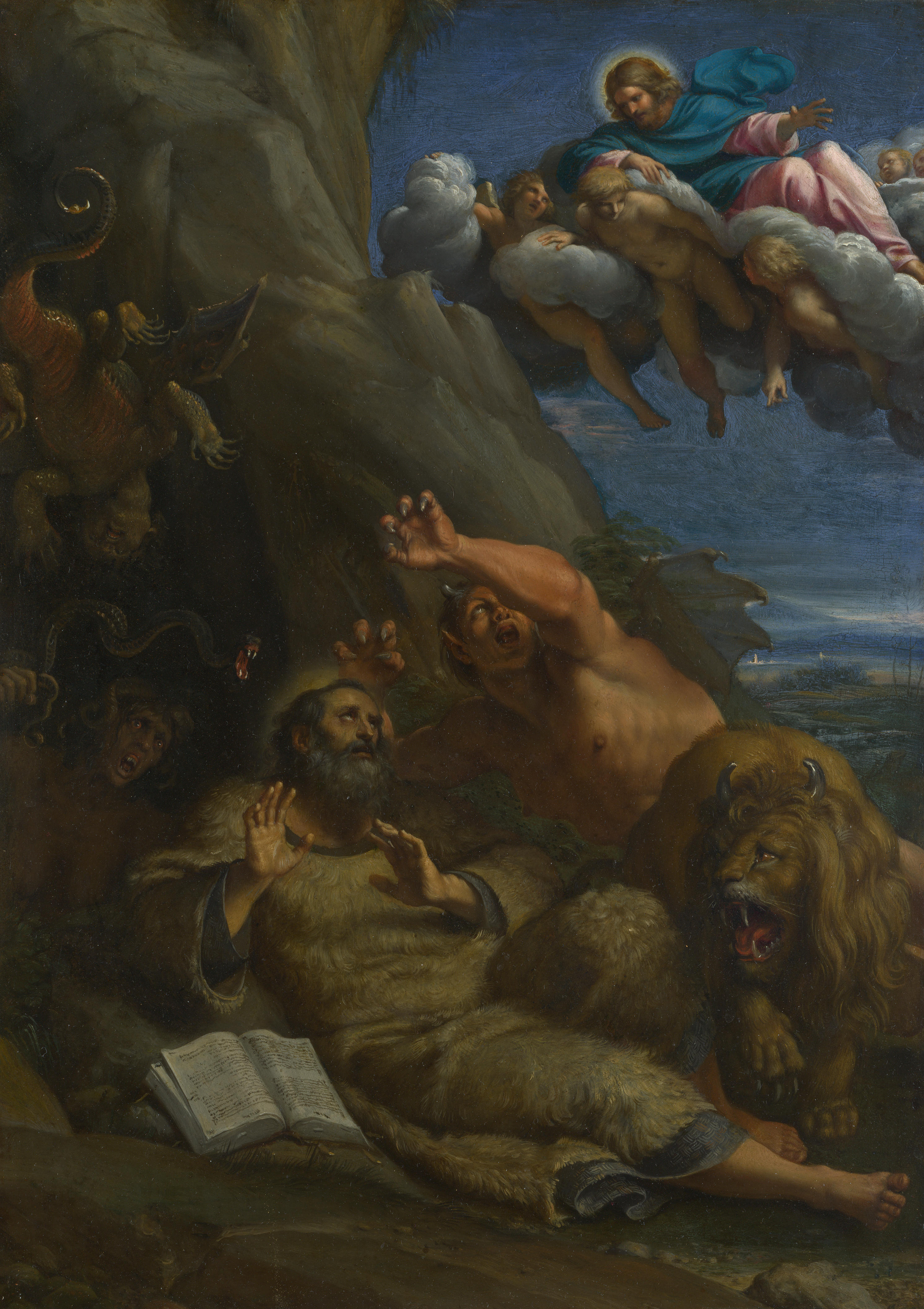
Christ Appearing to Saint Anthony Abbot (ca. 1598–1600) by Annibale Carracci

Christ Appearing to Saint Anthony Abbot or The Temptation of Saint Anthony is an oil-on-copper painting of Anthony the Great executed ca. 1598–1600 by the Italian painter Annibale Carracci. It was acquired in the 19th century by an English collector and is now in the National Gallery, London, which bought it in 1846.

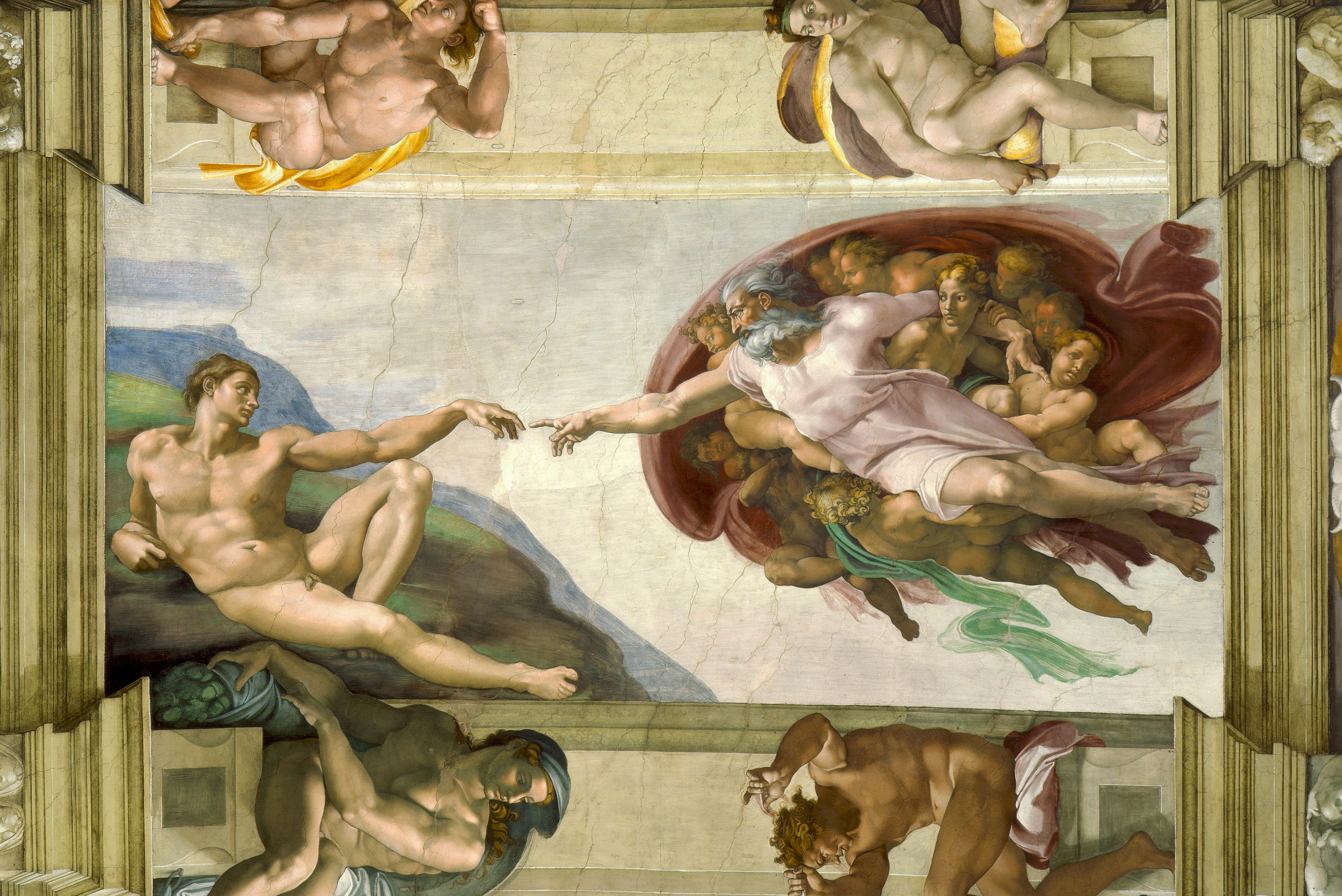
Creation of Adam

The saint's pose is strongly influenced by that of Adam in Michelangelo's Creation of Adam on the Sistine Chapel ceiling. The demons seem to draw on Flemish paintings of the saint's temptation, according to a compositional canon well-seen in a print by Antonio Tempesta.

It was recorded in the Borghese family collection in 1650 and Giovanni Pietro Bellori wrote it was worthy "of supreme praise", describing it in his 1672 Lives of the Artists as "the small copper [painting] in the Villa Borghese [of] Saint Anthony afflicted by monstrous demons, lying with his arms outstretched towards the Lord who appears to him to aid him".
