= Albert Lewin =

American film producer (1894–1968)

- Born: Albert Parsons Lewin; September 23, 1894; Brooklyn, New York, US
- Died: May 9, 1968 (aged 73); New York City, US
- Occupations: screenwriter, producer, director, production supervisor, script supervisor
- Years active: 1923–1968
- Spouse: Mildred Mindlin Jacobs (m.1918–1965)

Albert Lewin (September 23, 1894 – May 9, 1968) was an American film director, producer, and screenwriter.

== Personal life ==
Lewin was born in Brooklyn, New York and raised in Newark, New Jersey. He earned a master's degree at Harvard and taught English at the University of Missouri. During World War I, he served in the military and was afterwards appointed assistant national director of the American Jewish Relief Committee. He later became a drama and film critic for the Jewish Tribune until the early 1920s, when he went to Hollywood to become a reader for Samuel Goldwyn. Later he worked as a script clerk for directors King Vidor and Victor Sjöström before becoming a screenwriter at MGM in 1924.

Lewin was appointed head of the studio's script department and by the late 1920s was Irving Thalberg's personal assistant and closest associate. Nominally credited as an associate producer, he produced several of MGM's most important films of the 1930s. After Thalberg's death, he joined Paramount as a producer in 1937, where he remained until 1941. Notable producing credits during this period include True Confession (1937), Spawn of the North (1938), Zaza (1939) and So Ends Our Night (1941).

In 1942, Lewin began to direct. He made six films, writing all of them and producing several himself. As a director and writer, he showed literary and cultural aspirations in the selection and treatment of his themes. He was the best friend of actress Devi Dja and cast her in three of his movies but failed to get her a leading role in The Moon and Sixpence (1942). In 1966, Lewin published a novel, The Unaltered Cat.

== Films ==
As director:

- The Moon and Sixpence (1942)
- The Picture of Dorian Gray (1945)
- The Private Affairs of Bel Ami (1947)
- Pandora and the Flying Dutchman (1951)
- Saadia (1953)
- The Living Idol (1957)

As screenwriter:

- The Fate of a Flirt (1925)
- Spring Fever (1927)
