= Orley =

Orley, Örley or van Orley are given names and family names.

People with given name Orley

- Orley May (1897-1968), an American detective
- Orley Ashenfelter (born 1942), an American economist
- Orley Limpangog (born 1991), A Filipino Artist

People with surname Orley

- Bernard van Orley (between 1487 and 1491–1541), a leading artist in Dutch and Flemish Renaissance painting
- Jan van Orley (1665–1735), a Flemish painter, draughtsman, printmaker and designer
- Ladislaus Örley, a helminthologist
- Richard van Orley (1663–1732), a Flemish painter, draughtsman, printmaker and designer
- Thomas Orley (1934–2008), an American fencer

== See also ==
- Orley Farm (disambiguation)
