= Van Opstal =

Van Opstal is a Dutch/Flemish surname. Bearers of the name include:

- Arnold Van Opstal, a Filipino-German professional basketball player
- Gaspar Jacob van Opstal the Younger (1654–1717), a Flemish painter
- Gerard van Opstal (1594 or 1597–1668), a Flemish Baroque sculptor
- Henri van Opstal (born 20 February 1989), a Dutch kickboxer
