= Lodewijk van Schoor =

Flemish painter and draughtsman (c. 1645–1702)

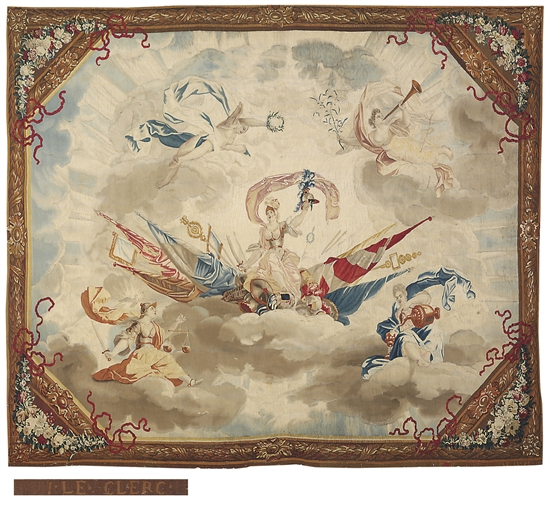
The Apotheosis of Good Government

Lodewijk van Schoor (c. 1645, Brussels (?) – buried 7 September 1702, Antwerp) was a Flemish painter, draughtsman and designer of tapestries. Van Schoor was one of the major figures of Flemish tapestry design in the late 17th and early 18th century, together with Victor Honoré Janssens and Jan van Orley.

== Life ==
Very little is known about the life and training of Lodewijk van Schoor. His origins likely lie in Brussels since he needed to get special dispensation from the Antwerp magistrate when he established himself in Antwerp in April 1696. He was registered as a master in the Brussels Guild of Saint Luke in 1678.

He is firmly recorded in Antwerp where he registered as a master in the local Guild of Saint Luke in the year 1695–1696. He was in Antwerp a master of Jacques Ignatius de Roore.

He died in Antwerp where he was buried in the St James Church on 7 September 1702.

== Work ==
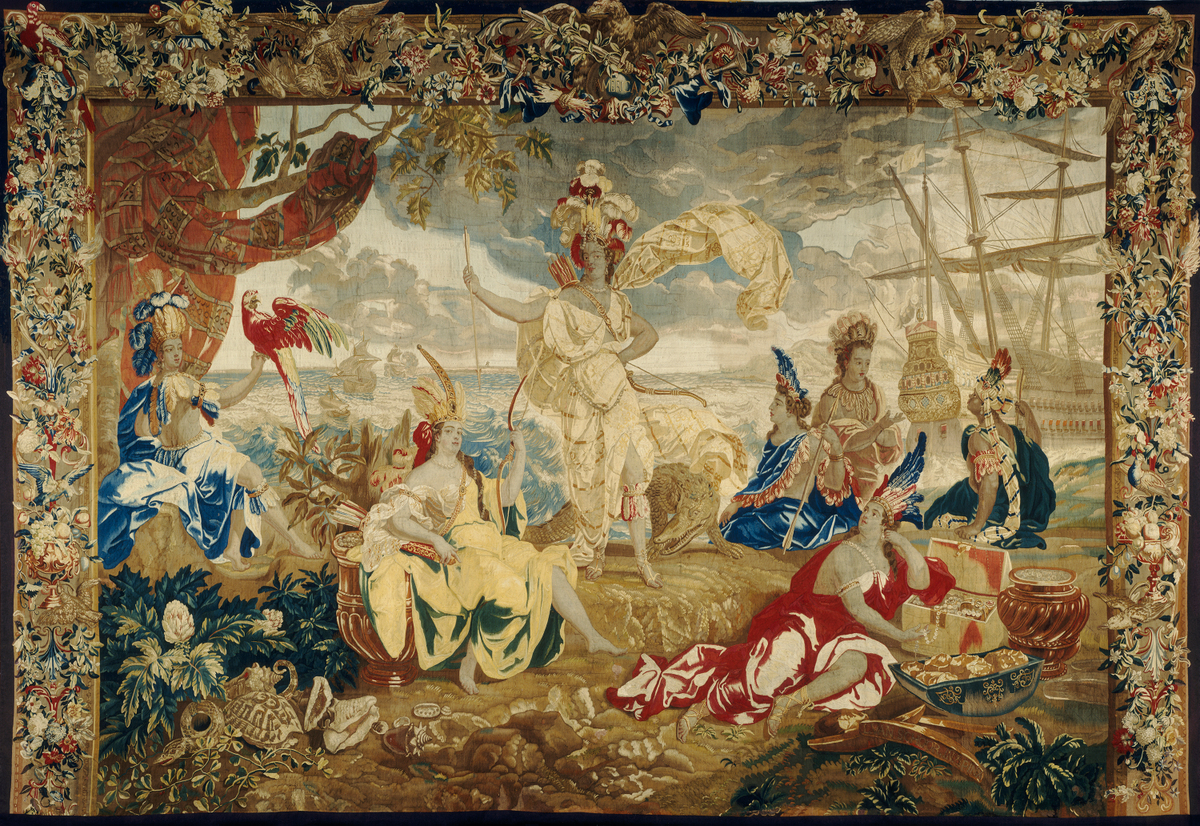
America

Although Lodewijk van Schoor was registered as a painter when he registered at the Antwerp Guild of Saint Luke, he is now principally known as a designer for the tapestry workshops in Brussels and no paintings have been confidently attributed to him. His signature 'L. van Schoor inv. et pinx.' was woven in various series of tapestries produced at the Brussels tapestry workshops. He may have painted altarpieces as may be deduced from a drawing preserved at the Royal Museums of Fine Arts of Belgium signed by van Schoor and the Brussels sculptor Jan Baptiste de Vree, which is a design for an altarpiece of Saint Barbara. A Landscape with Tree (Usher Gallery) has been attributed to Lodewijk van Schoor. However, this is likely by another Lodewijk van Schoor or other van Schoor as his lifetime dates (1666–1726) do not correspond to the artist discussed in this article. Moreover, as the landscapes in the tapestry workshops designed by Lodewijk van Schoor were usually drawn by specialist landscape painters while he was typically responsible for the staffage, it is less likely he practised as a landscape painter.

The presence of tapestry designs by French artists Charles Poerson and Charles Le Brun in Antwerp and Brussels is documented in 1663 and 1673. These designs were used by the tapestry workshops in Brussels and Antwerp as models. The French classicising style of these models influenced artists like Lodewijk van Schoor and Lambert de Hondt the Younger to adopt a more lighthearted rendering of mythological subjects than was current in the Flemish Baroque canon. Their mythological scenes looked more like elegant genre scenes with figures placed in rich landscapes than the violent and complex compositions of Rubens and his entourage. This elegant style was important for the survival of the tapestry industry in Brussels, Antwerp and Oudenaarde, which had to contend with stiff competition of the French state-run Gobelins Manufactory.

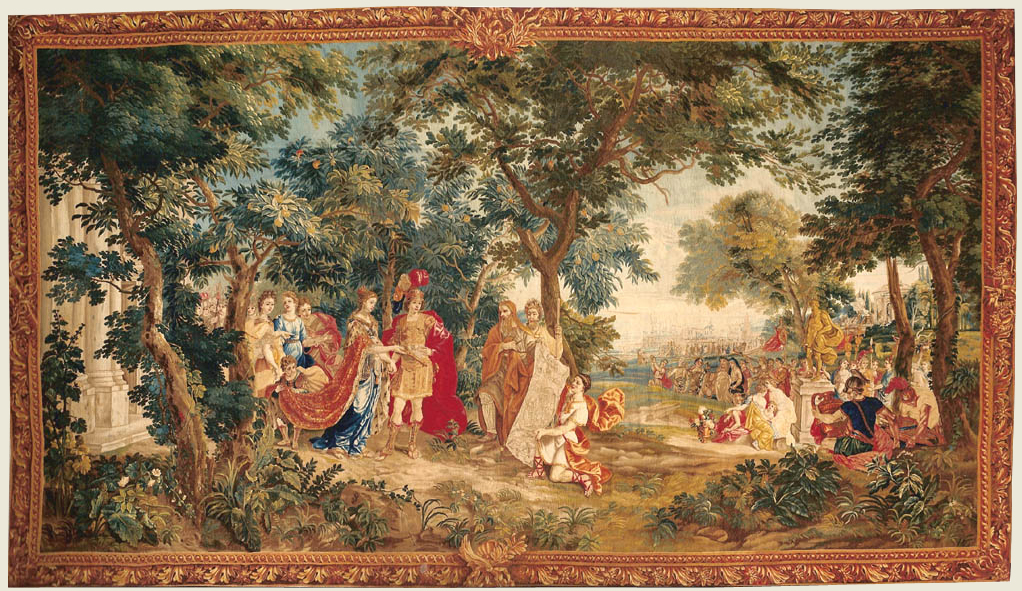
Dido showing Aeneas the map of Carthago

Van Schoor designed various tapestry series dealing with allegorical subjects, which were intended to serve as a fairly neutral decoration. He made series of the Seasons, Months (2 months per tapestry), the Four Elements and the Four Continents. Before 1700 van Schoor designed various sets of tapestries including Verdures with Small Figures Depicting the Story of Dido and Aeneas, the Story of Narcissus and Echo, a set of Hunts and the Story of Jacob. His designs of the Four Continents inspired a series on the similar theme designed by the Italian artist Giovanni Camillo Sagrestani for the tapestry workshop in Florence.

These series designed by van Schoor could be ordered in various quantities and sizes and adapted to particular preferences and specifications of the patrons. For instance, a tapestry of Earth from a series of the Elements attributed to the workshop of Jan Frans van der Hecke from the 17th century exists in a version with a classical architectural setting or a landscape background. Van Schoor typically depicted female personages in stately poses either seated or walking solemnly before or through majestic porches opening to a park.

The cartoons he made for the tapestry workshops were often a collaborative effort with other artists such as Pieter Spierinckx, Augustin Coppens and Lucas Achtschellinck. Van Schoor was typically responsible for the figures and the other artists for the landscapes.
