= Jacques Ignatius de Roore =

Flemish painter, copyist, art dealer and art collector

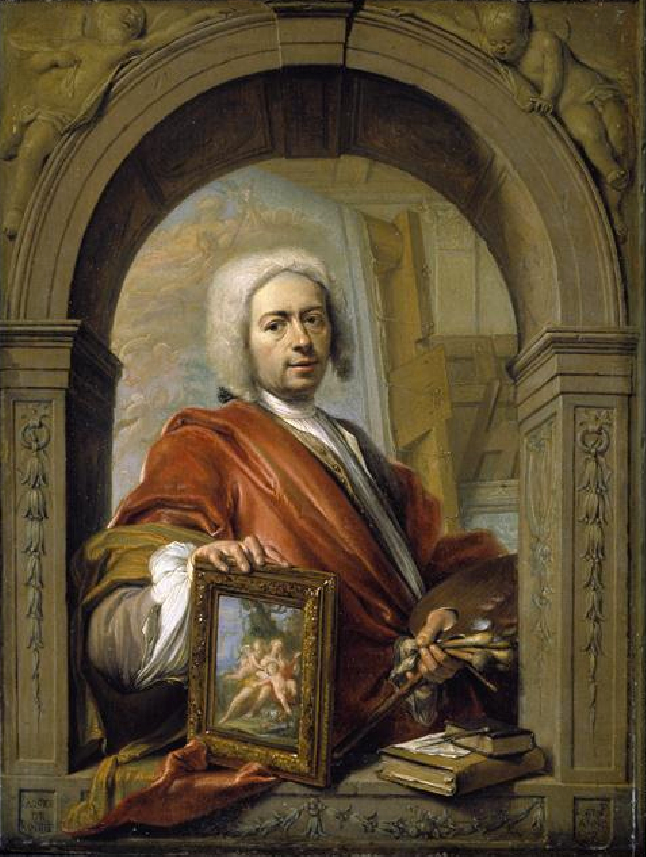
Self-portrait

Jacques Ignatius de Roore or Jacobus Ignatius de Roore (Antwerp, 20 July 1686 – The Hague, 17 July 1747) was a Flemish painter, copyist, art dealer and art collector who worked in the Southern Netherlands and the Dutch Republic.

== Life ==
De Roore was born in Antwerp in 1686 as the son of Erik de Roore, a dealer in paintings and antiques, and Anna Maria van der Haegen, the daughter of a painter. He started his training as a painter with Jan Sebastiaen Loybos in 1699. He briefly interrupted his artistic studies after his mother died on 15 February 1701 and trained with his uncle Karel van der Haegen as a goldsmith. He was able to start his study of painting again through the intervention of the leading Antwerp painter Abraham Genoels. He trained from 1701 to 1702 with the Brussels tapestry designer Lodewijk van Schoor who had established himself in Antwerp in 1696.

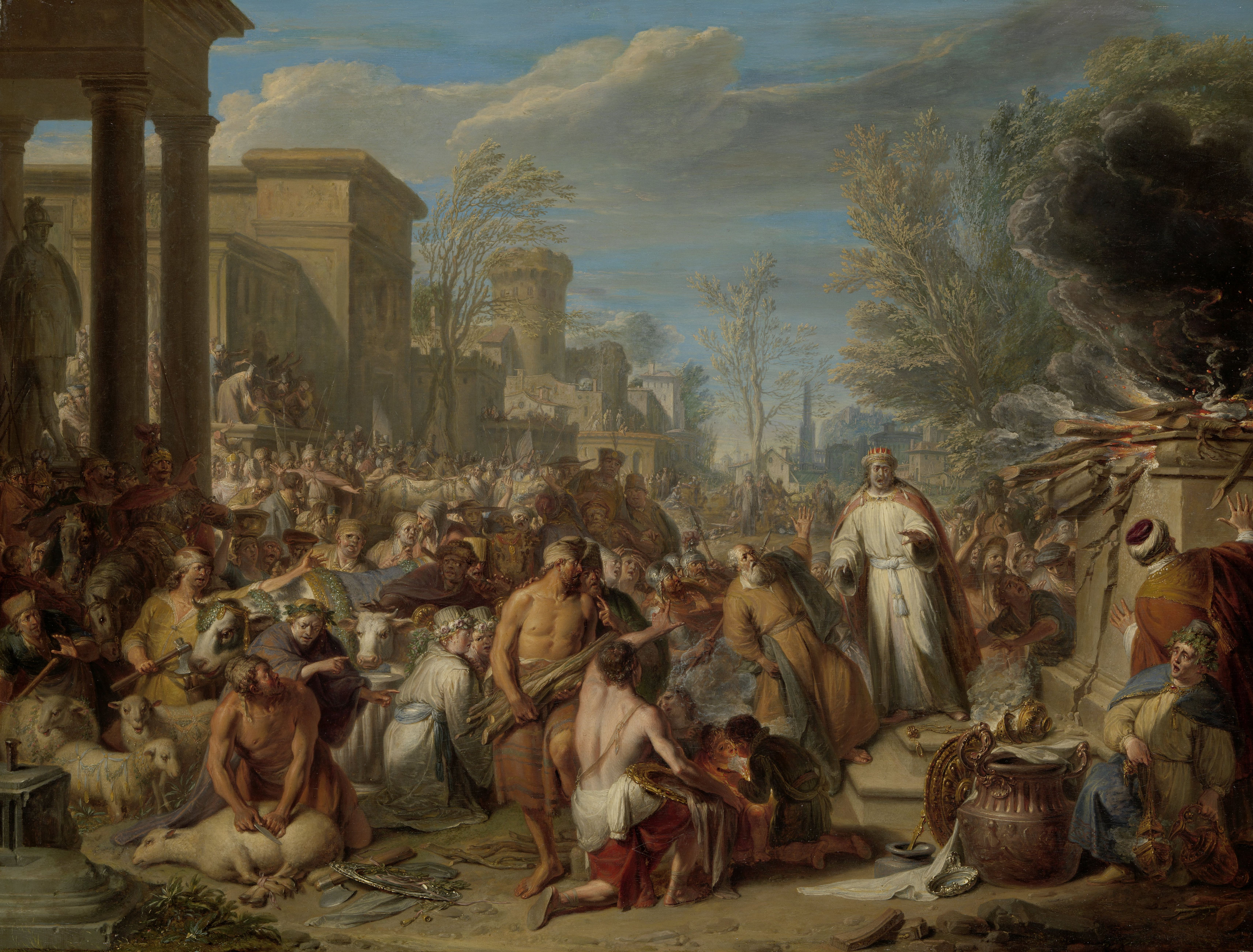
The Idolatry of Jeroboam

Lodewijk van Schoor died in September 1702. De Roore then left with his new guardian for Brussels in May 1703 to find another teacher but was unsuccessful. He returned to his hometown where he studied for a while with the Guild of Saint Luke in Antwerp. On 7 December 1705 he won the first prize for life drawing of the Antwerp Academy. On 17 March 1706 he joined the workshop of Gaspar Jacob van Opstal the Younger. In 1707 he became a free master in the Antwerp Guild of Saint Luke.

He worked initially as a copyist of the works of the leading Antwerp masters. His first signed work was a religious composition painted for the St. James' Church in Antwerp in 1709. He found it difficult to obtain regular work and wished to leave for Italy in 1710 but was prevented from doing so by his legal guardian. He married Joanna Catharina van der Cammen on 14 February 1712 and had a daughter who died in infancy. De Roore received commissions for paintings and decorations in the Antwerp City Hall from around 1715. These works gained him a reputation and commissions from patrons in the Dutch Republic, where he worked in Amsterdam in 1720. He returned to Antwerp for a brief period and then took on more commissions in Amsterdam. After the death of his wife in Antwerp on 15 March 1722, de Roore sold all his property in Antwerp and settled in Amsterdam. Subsequently, he moved to Rotterdam and finally to The Hague where he became a member of the local Guild of Saint Luke. In the Dutch Republic the artist worked on multiple decorative paintings for houses in the cities of Amsterdam, Rotterdam and The Hague.

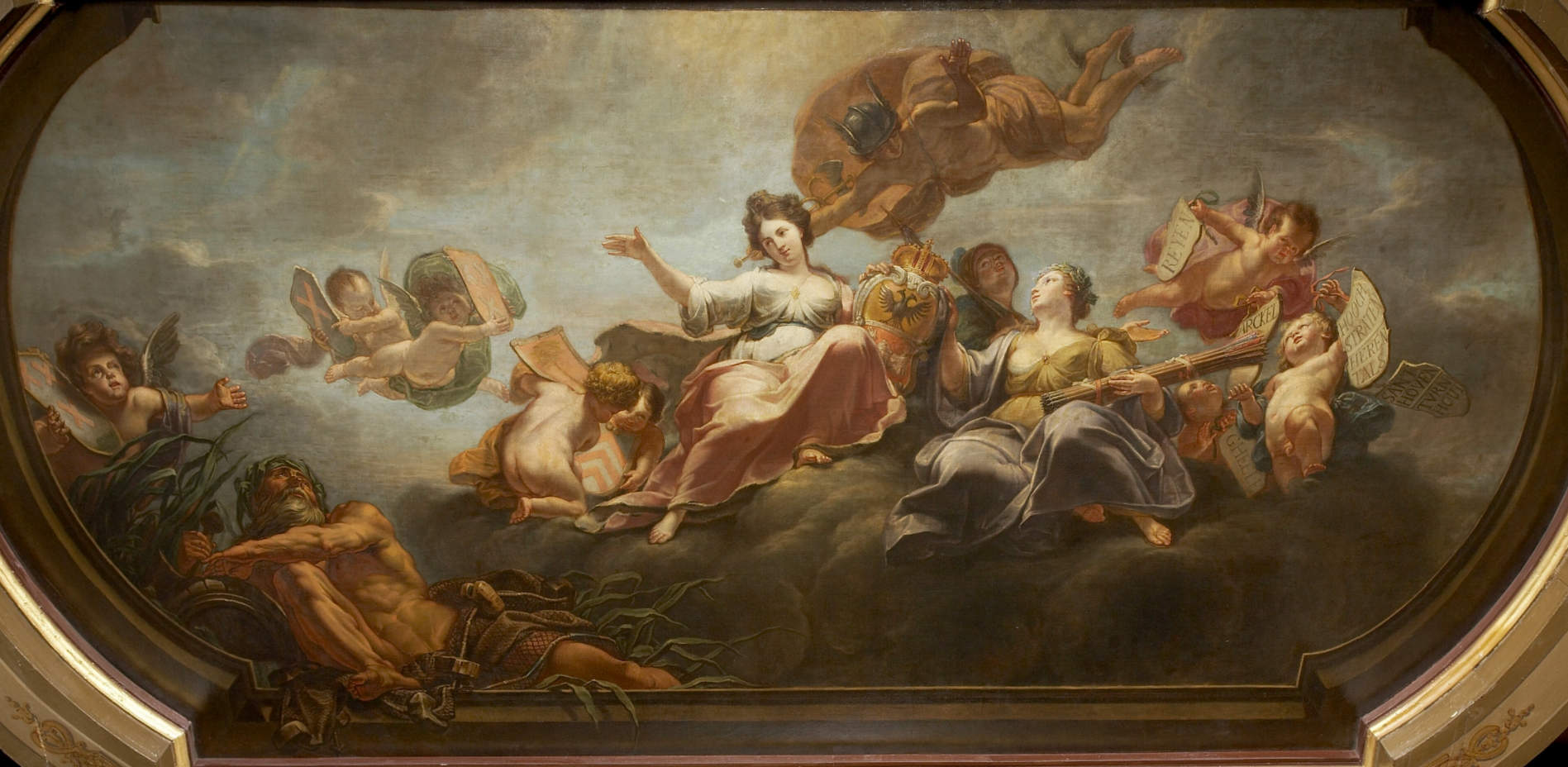
Mercury and Ceres urge Scaldis to wake Antwerpia

Returning briefly to Antwerp in 1728 the artist got married with one of his models who followed him to The Hague. The marriage did not last and his young wife returned to Antwerp. Finding it difficult to find steady work, he became an art dealer and collaborated with the Dutch painter and dealer Gerard Hoet. De Roore and Gerard Hoet reportedly negotiated an agreement for the sale of van Dyck's St Martin Dividing his Cloak but were stopped by the local villagers from removing the painting from the church in Zaventem where it was located.

De Roore restored and expanded old master paintings. It is known that he expanded at least five works of Melchior de Hondecoeter. In 1740 he received a large commission to decorate all walls of a room in the Amsterdam residence of Gerard Arnout Hasselaer on the Keizersgracht. For this commission de Roore produced a series of paintings based on the story of Pandora. All of de Roore's decorative work that he produced in the Netherlands has disappeared.

De Roore died on 17 July 1747 in The Hague leaving a substantial art collection, which was subsequently auctioned off.

== Work ==
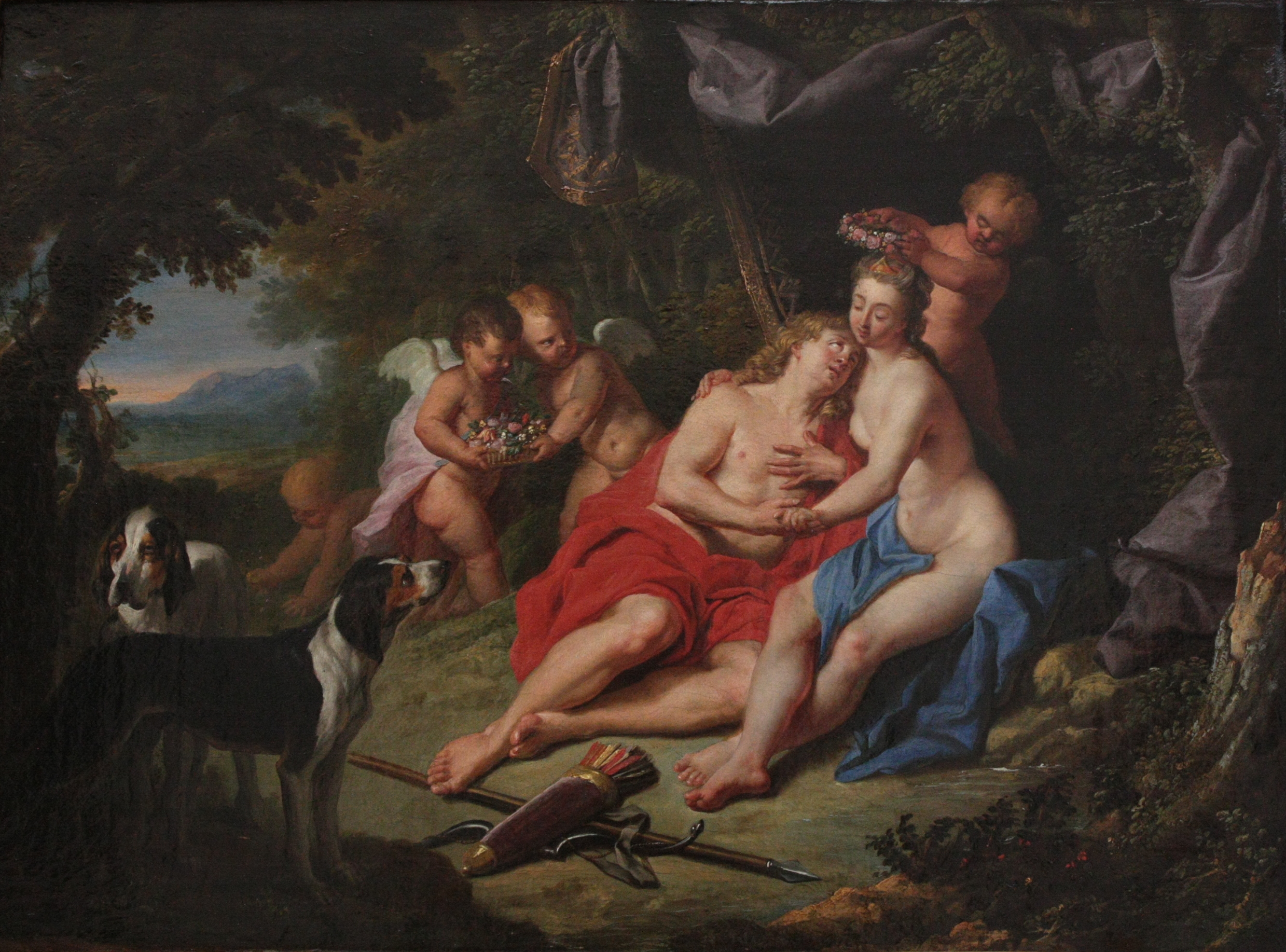
Venus and Adonis, Museum of Grenoble.

Jacques Ignatius de Roore painted mainly historical subjects and portraits. He was best known for his decorative ceiling and wall paintings and a few altarpieces. He also produced imitations and copies of the great Flemish masters such as Rubens, van Dyck and David Teniers II.

Paintings by de Roore are in the collections of the Louvre Museum (the Couple before the Altar of a Temple Dedicated to Diana), the Rijksmuseum (the Idolatry of Jeroboam) and the Royal Museum of Fine Arts Antwerp (The City of Antwerp pays tribute to the Austrian dynasty and Samson insulted by the Philistines).
