= Augustin Coppens =

(1668–1740) Flemish painter, engraver, draughtsman and tapestry designer

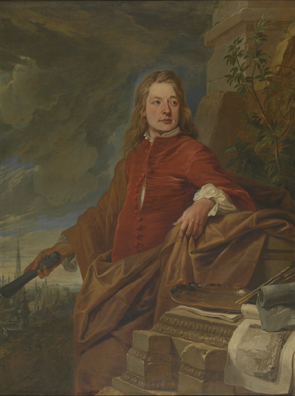
Portrait of Augustin Coppens

Augustin Coppens or Aurelius Augustinus Coppens (9 March 1668, in Brussels – 31 August 1740, in Brussels) was a Flemish painter, engraver, draughtsman and tapestry designer active in Brussels, which was first part of the Spanish Netherlands and later the Austrian Netherlands. He specialized in landscape and city views. He is now mainly known for his tapestry designs and for his drawings and prints documenting the devastating effect on the civil buildings caused by the Bombardment of Brussels by French troops in 1695.

== Life ==
Augustin Coppens was born as the youngest son of the landscape painter Frans Coppens in Brussels where he was baptized on 9 March 1668. He is believed to have trained with Jean François Millet (I).

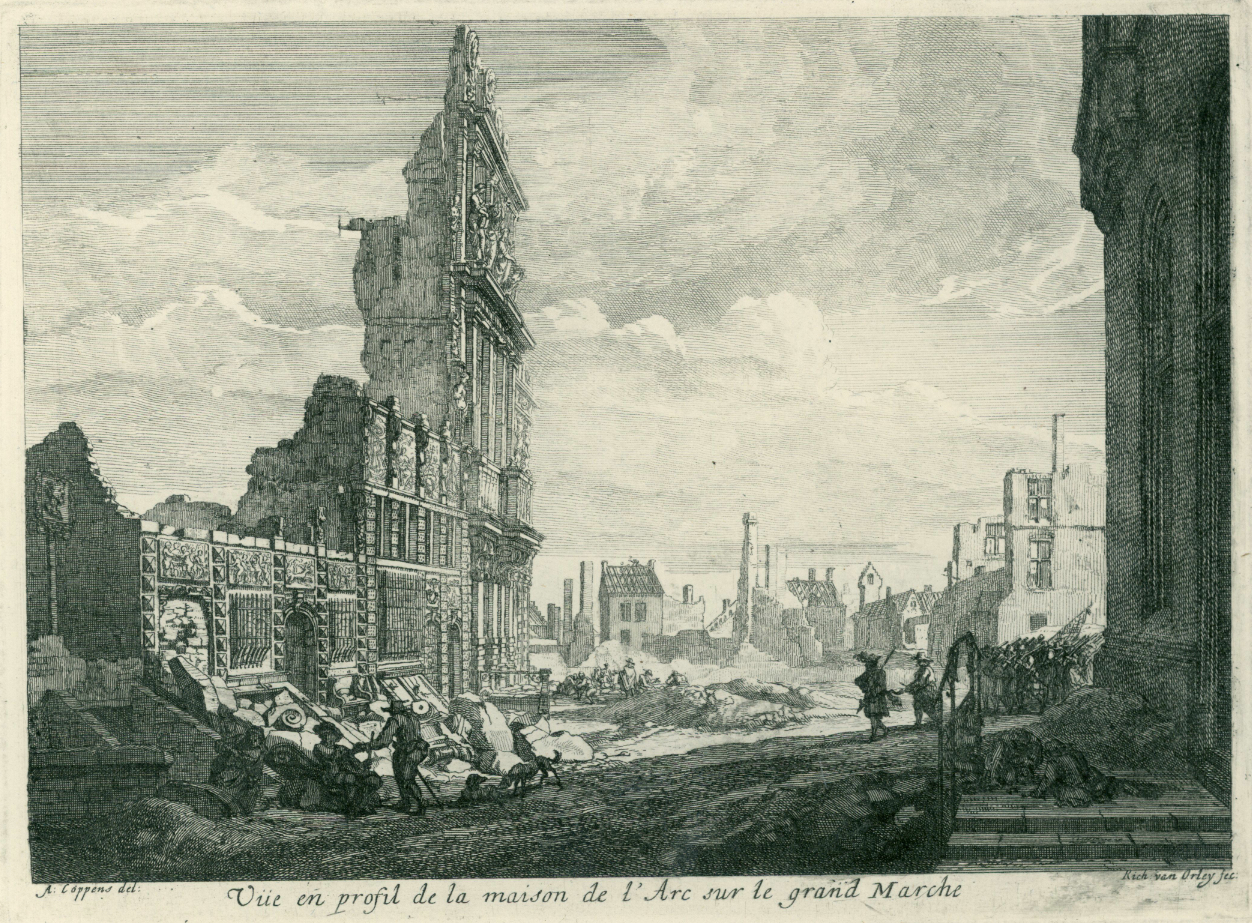
Profile view of the house of the Bow on the Grand Place

On 13, 14 and 15 August 1695 French troops carried out the first artillery bombardment on a civil population in modern history. This event, known as the Bombardment of Brussels, caused the destruction of a third of the buildings in Brussels. Augustin Coppens' home was also destroyed. Coppens took to the streets of Brussels and documented the horrible destruction of his hometown. He engraved 12 of the drawings, some with the help of his friend Richard van Orley. The plates were published the same year in Brussels under the title Perspectives des Ruines de la Ville de Bruxelles. The publication was widely circulated and assured Coppens' fame. The prints were also reproduced in different sizes and colors by the German engraver Peter Schenk the Elder in Amsterdam. The prints have an important documentary value by providing a record of the impact of the bombardment. Seven further plates from Coppens' drawings were engraved by the Brussels engraver Jan Lauwryn Krafft and published in 1715. A portrait painting of Coppens showing him standing with a paper roll and his brushes before a landscape with the ruins of Brussels was for a long time regarded as his self-portrait but is now believed to be by an unknown hand.

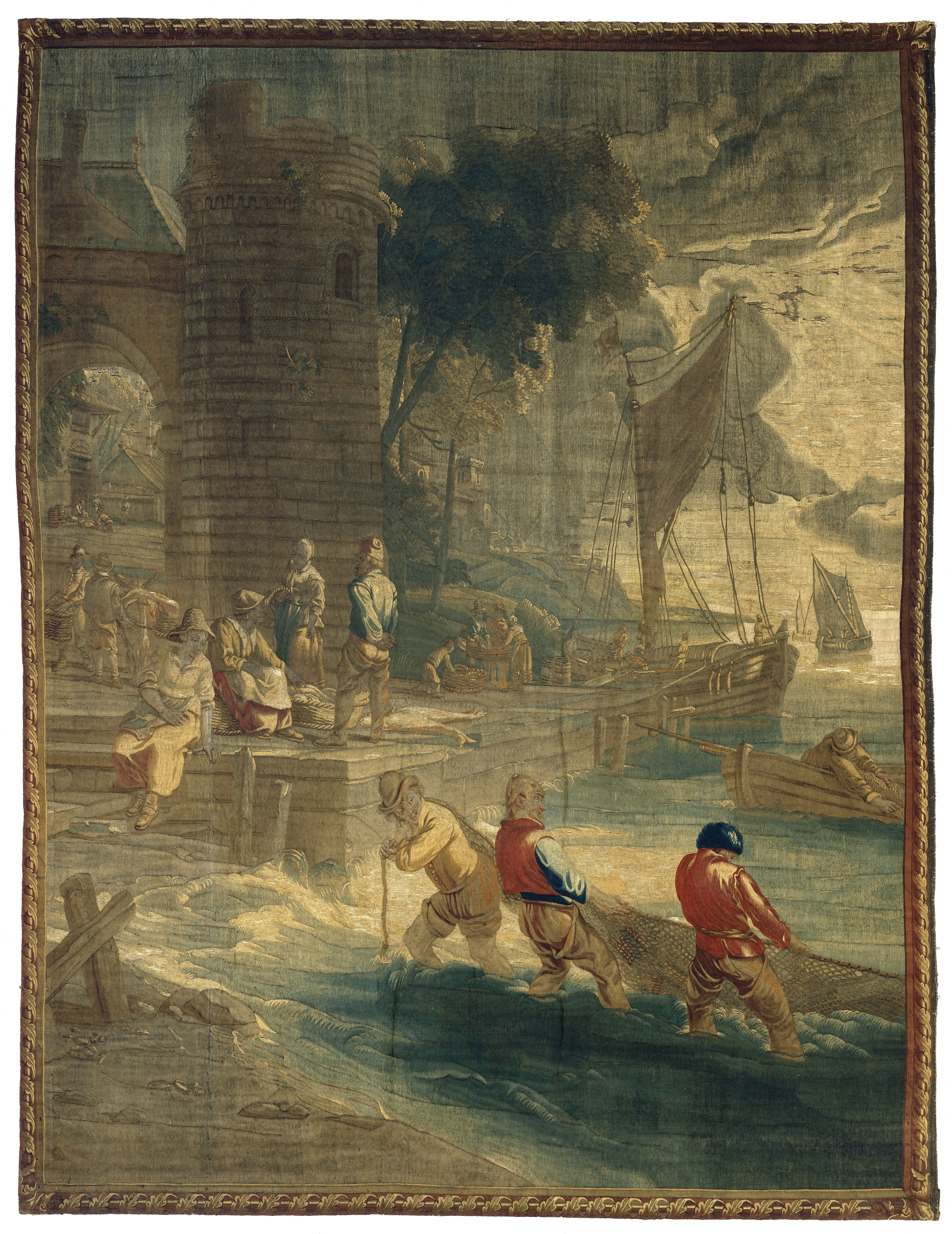
The fish kay

Augustin Coppens joined the Brussels Guild of Saint Luke in 1698 when he was already 30 years old. By his account he had already commenced designing tapestries and cartoons before he joined the Guild. He was very productive as a tapestry designer working on commissions from workshops in Brussels, Antwerp and Oudenaarde.

== Works ==
=== General ===
Augustin Coppens specialized in city views, landscapes and portraits. He worked in various mediums including painting, etching, drawing and tapestry design. Only one portrait painting is currently attributed to Coppens, a Portrait of Prince Joseph Ferdinand of Bavaria (1695, Museum of the City of Brussels).

Coppens is mainly known for his tapestry designs and for his drawings and prints documenting the devastating effect on the civil buildings caused by the Bombardment of Brussels by French troops.

=== Tapestry ===
Coppens worked as a designer of many tapestry series for workshops in the leading tapestry manufacturing centers in Flanders. He typically collaborated on these designs with specialist history painters. Coppens would take responsibility for the landscapes in the cartoon designs. He worked with many of the leading tapestry designers of his time including Victor Honoré Janssens, Jan van Orley, Lodewijk van Schoor and Zeger Jacob van Helmont.

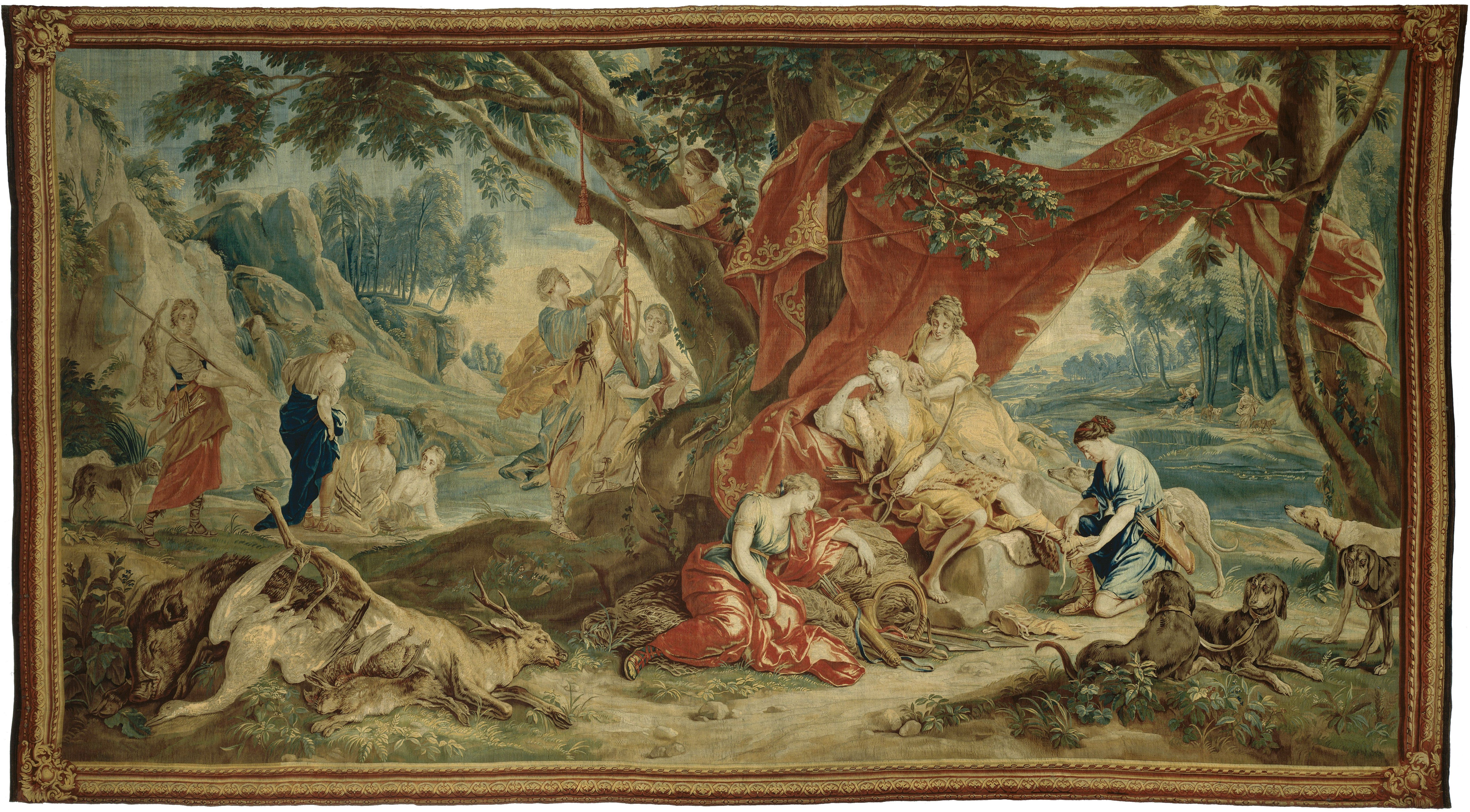
Resting Diana, from the Triumph of the Gods

In the early 1700s Coppens and Jan van Orley became the leading team of tapestry designers for the Reydams Leyniers tapestry workshop in Brussels. Coppens and Jan van Orley created a neo-Baroque style for the Brussels workshops. In their works of the early 1700s, Coppens and van Orley created mythological, romance, and genre scenes which were of a lighter spirit and tone than before. They contributed to the early 18th century move in the Brussels workshops towards more playful forms, away from the severe Baroque historical and mythological subjects and towards a lighter Régence style. This involved a more relaxed narrative in the tapestries and sometimes the loose compilation of associated subjects, chosen according to a client's request. This development is apparent in the series on The Triumphs of the Gods on which Coppens collaborated with Victor Honoré Janssens for the workshop of Judocus de Vos. Coppens contributed on another series on the same theme with Jan van Orley for the Leyniers workshop. In these tapestries Coppens showed his sophisticated use of colours with the greens and browns of the foreground merging into shades of yellow and blue.
