= Orley Farm =

Orley Farm may refer to:

- Orley Farm (novel), by Anthony Trollope
- Orley Farm School, in Harrow, London, England
