= Gaspar Jacob van Opstal the Younger =

Flemish painter

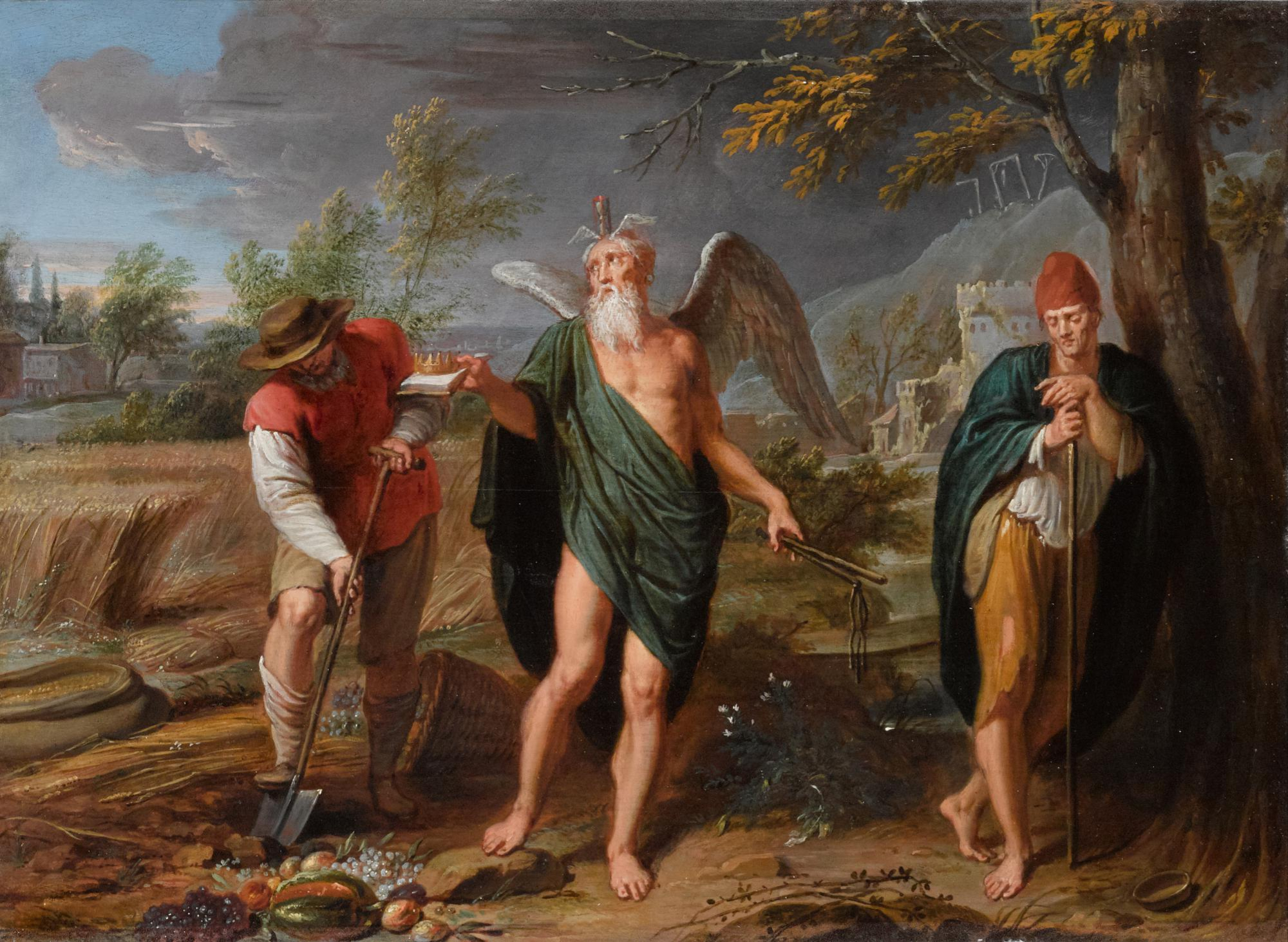
Allegory of time, work and idleness

Gaspar Jacob van Opstal the Younger or Jasper Jacob van Opstal the Younger (christened on 2 July 1654 in Antwerp – buried on 12 January 1717 in Antwerp), was a Flemish painter active in Antwerp and Italy in the second half of the 17th century and the early 18th century. He is known for his mythological and biblical scenes and portraits. He is regarded as one of the capable followers of Rubens' grand style.

== Life ==
Gaspar Jacob van Opstal the Younger was born in Antwerp as the natural son of the painter son of Gaspar-Jacob the Elder and Joanna Robatto. He was baptized on 2 July 1654 in the Saint George Church of Antwerp. His parents married on 23 June 1661 and had two daughters afterwards. Gaspar the Younger started his training with his father who himself had trained with Simon de Vos. He was registered at Antwerp's Guild of Saint Luke as a 'wijnmeester' (i.e. the son of a master) in the guild year 1676–1677.

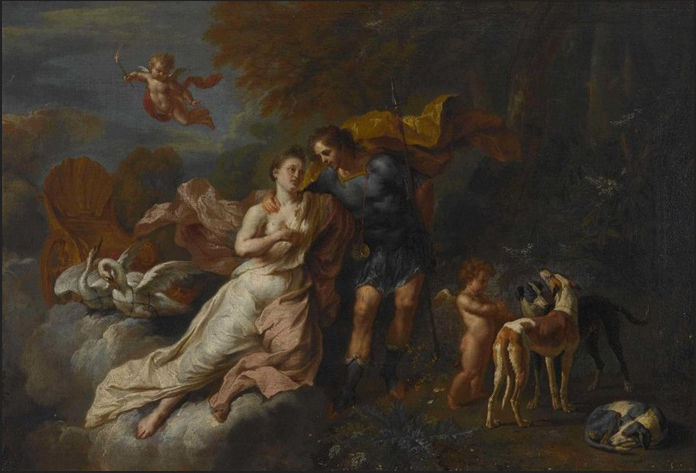
Venus and Adonis

He married Anna Maria Hofmans on 27 February 1681. The couple did not have children. He was for many years from 1698 until his death, a dean of the Guild. He bought off the obligation to perform the duties of the dean because he was very busy with his work. He paid the favour by paying money, offering wine and painting a portrait of Jan Karel Nicolaas van Hove, the mayor of Antwerp and headman of the painter's chamber of the Guild.

He was very sought after as a teacher as evidenced by the fact that throughout his career he had a total of 35 pupils registered at the Guild. This also points to a large workshop. His pupils included Josephus Franciscus Brouwne, Frans Casteels (III), Cornelis van Dalen, Jan Baptist van Doren, Jan Carel Henry, Cornelis Joseph d'Heur, Adriaen van Os, Jacques Ignatius de Roore, Philip van de Santvoort, Philippus le Tombe and Karel Wuchters.

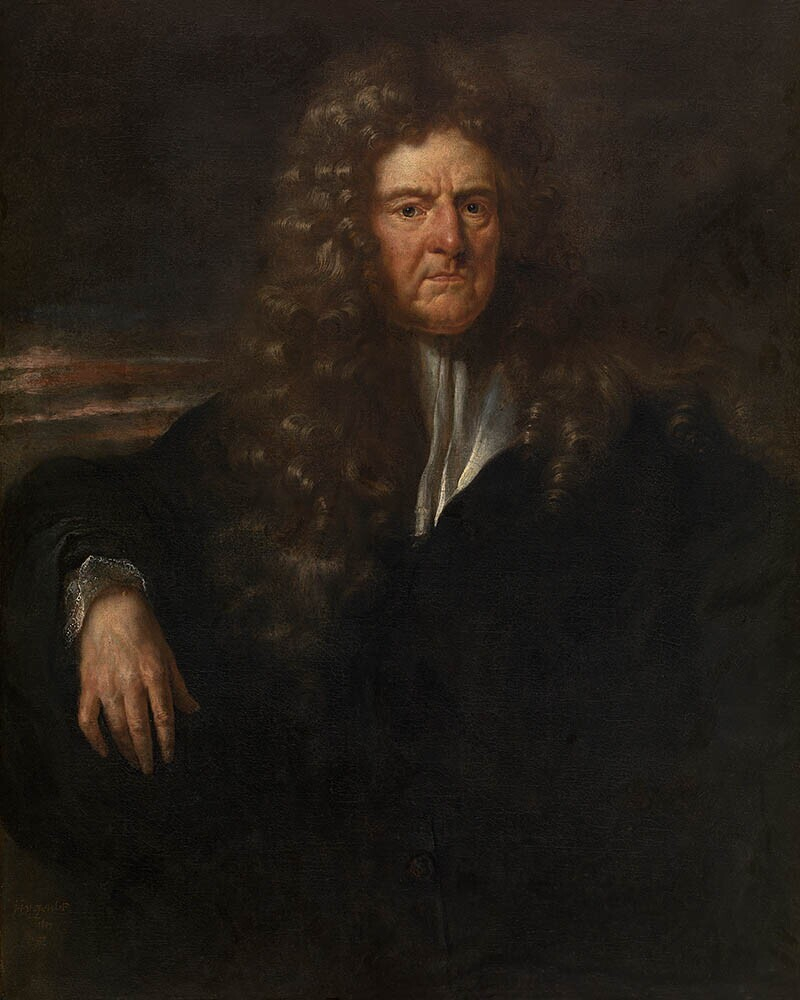
Portrait of Andries Eugeen van Valckenisse

The Marshall of Villeroy commissioned from him a copy of the deposition of the Cross by Rubens in 1704. The city administration ordered a portrait of King Charles III in 1707.

He was buried on 12 January 1717 in the Cathedral of Antwerp. His wife died on 17 March 1721. She left a large estate of which Karel Wuchters, her godson and nephew and pupil of her husband, inherited 500 guilders.

== Work ==
Gaspar Jacob van Opstal is known for his paintings of portraits and biblical scenes. His father had been a copyist of the works of Rubens and had instilled in Gaspar an admiration for that Flemish artist which influenced his style and subject matter. He was known as a good colorist and had a free brush technique. He drew his figures very accurately and was able to depict their emotional state very well.
