= Bombardment of Brussels =

1695 battle of the Nine Years' War

Coordinates: 50.8467°N 4.3524°E

- Part of the Nine Years' War
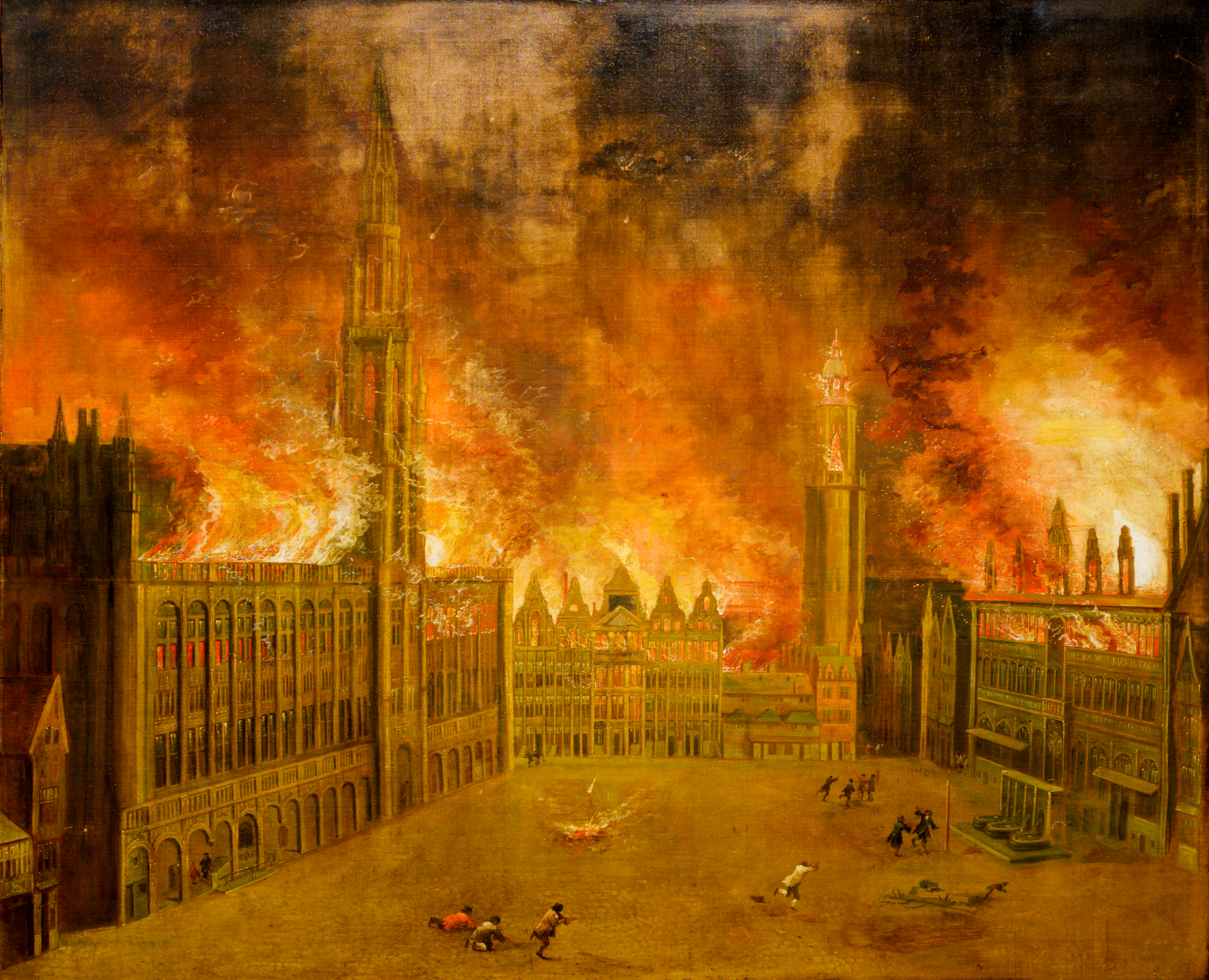
- The Grand-Place/Grote Markt on fire on the night of August 13 to 14, 1695 (anonymous painting)
Date	August 13–15, 1695
Location	Brussels, Southern Netherlands

Belligerents
France	Spain

Commanders and leaders
Louis XIV; Duke of Villeroi	Philippe de Berghes

During the Nine Years' War, the French Royal Army carried out a bombardment of Brussels from August 13–15, 1695. Led by King Louis XIV and the Duke of Villeroi, French forces bombarded the city in an attempt to divert Grand Alliance troops from reinforcing the concurrent siege of Namur. The bombardment ultimately proved to be the most destructive event in the history of Brussels, destroying a third of the buildings in the city, including the Grand-Place/Grote Markt (Brussels' main square).

After the bombardment, reconstruction efforts over the following years profoundly changed the appearance of the city and left numerous traces still visible today. The French attempt to divert the Grand Alliance was ultimately unsuccessful, though Louis XIV's reputation suffered for his involvement in the destruction of the city.

== Background ==
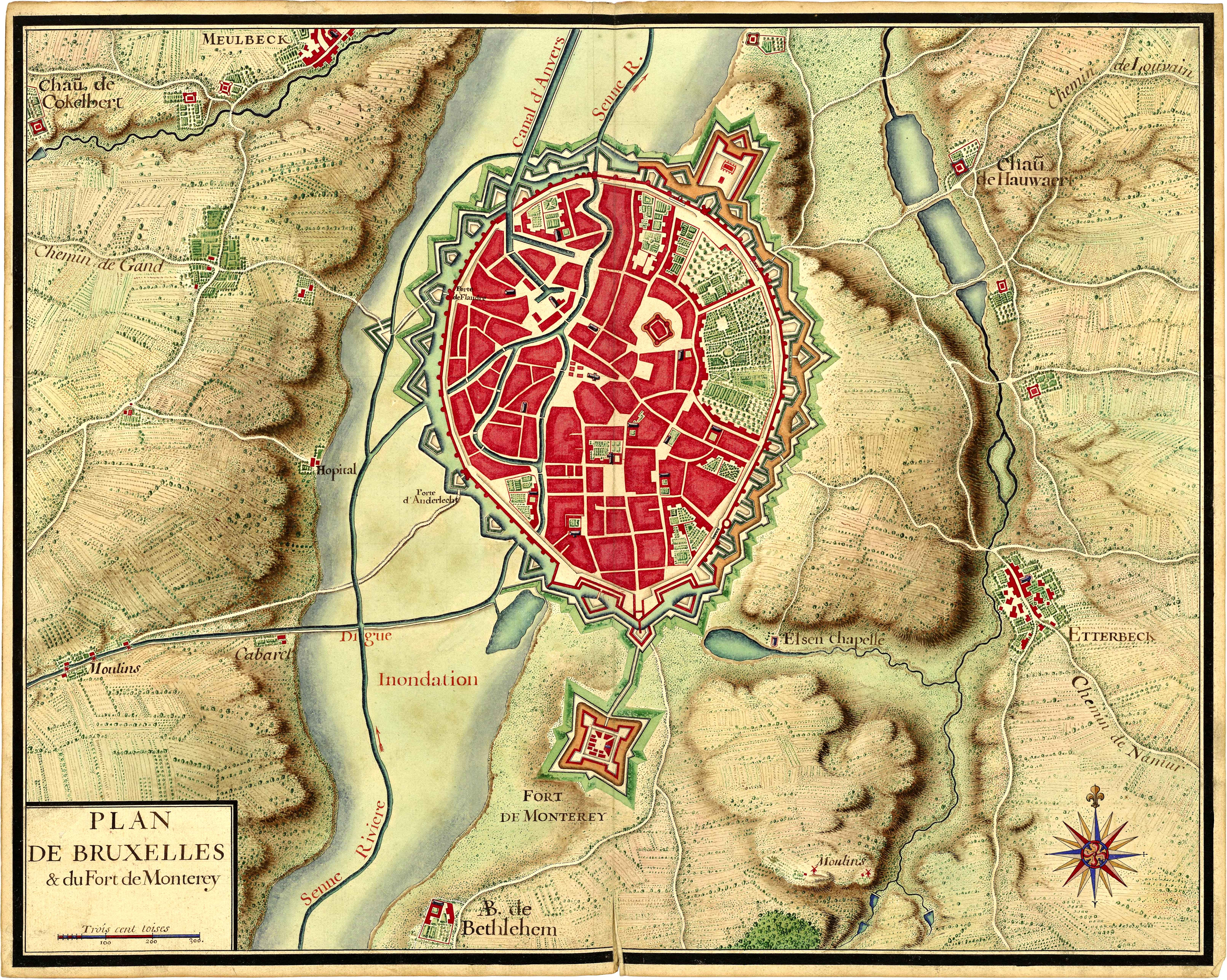
Map of Brussels from the collection of maps gathered for Louis XIV during the War of the Spanish Succession

The 17th century, called the 'Great Century' by the French, was anything but great for the inhabitants of the Southern Netherlands. During this period, this region went through a succession of wars and destruction, exacerbated by large armies traversing the region at the whim of the great powers. In 1695, nearly forty years after the Battle of the Dunes of 1658, France began its policy of territorial expansion. This expansion resulted in the gradual annexation of Spanish possessions to France's north. Wars were fought and alliances made and broken, and fortresses continuously changed hands. The Nine Years' War had been raging since 1688. Opposing France was a large European coalition, the Grand Alliance, with its head as William III of Orange, leader of the Netherlands, and soon to be king of England. Alongside William stood Spain, Sweden, the Holy Roman Empire as well as several electors, among them Maximilian II Emanuel, Elector of Bavaria, governor of the Spanish Netherlands.

In July 1695, the city of Namur, occupied for three years by the French, was besieged by King William III at the head of an allied army. After the death of the Duke of Luxembourg, the French army was led by the Duke of Villeroi, a mediocre strategist but close to the king. The king, irritated at the recent turn of events, urged Villeroi to destroy Bruges or Ghent in a surprise attack. Villeroi, eager to please the king, instead suggested that bombarding Brussels would have more of an effect in drawing the enemy to a place in which the French could attack them strategically.

== Bombardment ==
=== Preparations ===
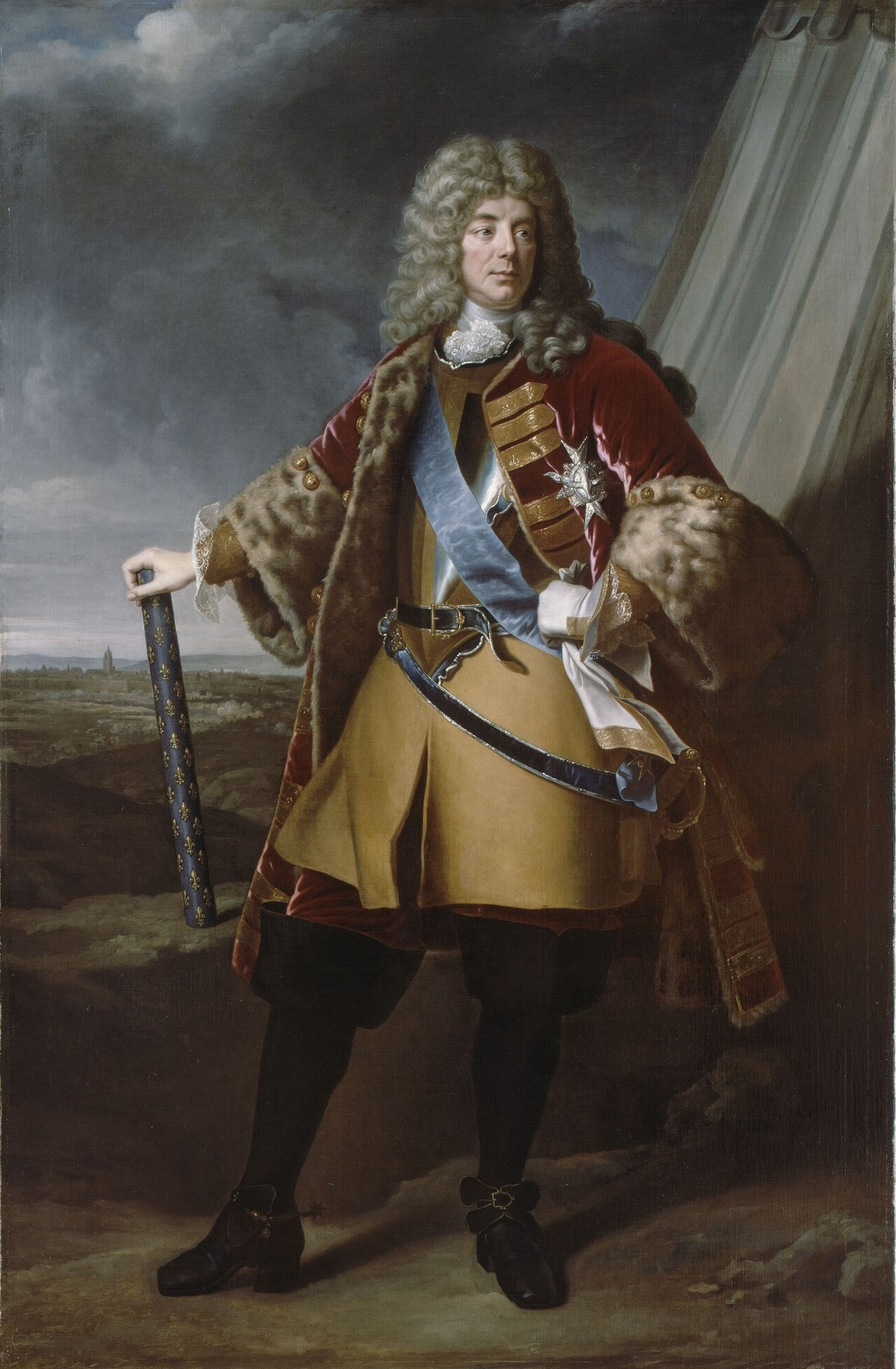
François de Neufville, Duke of Villeroy, led the attack

At the end of July, Villeroi sent the king a request for supplies, compiled by his master of artillery. He evaluated that 12 cannons, 25 mortars, 4000 cannonballs, 5000 explosive shells, a large amount of gunpowder, lead shot, grenades and fuses, and 900 wagons for transport would be necessary. In addition, there would need to be a baggage train capable of supplying arms and provisions to an army of nearly 70,000 men. The supplies and troops were largely taken out of French garrisons and strongholds in the region, and on August 7, Villeroi left Mons for Brussels with a baggage train of nearly 1500 carts.

These maneuvers did not pass unnoticed, as Villeroi let his intentions be known with the goal of worrying the allied armies besieging Namur. On August 3, a truce was declared in the siege in order to treat the wounded and restock the citadel. After six days, the siege resumed, with both William III and Maximilian II Emanuel standing their ground. Only the small army of the Prince of Vaudemont, near the city of Ghent, was able to achieve anything, by controlling roads leading to Brussels. Having only 15,000 men, however, he was forced to withdraw faced with Villeroi's much larger force. The French army arrived in the vicinity of Brussels on August 11, and installed themselves on the high ground to the west of the city. Brussels was not strongly defended, as its walls offered no defense, despite improvements made by the Spanish in the previous century. Two entrenchments in front of Flanders Gate and Anderlecht Gate were easily taken by the French, who then installed their artillery nearby.

On August 13 Villeroi sent a letter to Philippe François de Berghes, the military governor of Brussels. Because hoping to draw the allied armies away from Namur could not reasonably be used as justification for an attack on the civilian population of a relatively defenseless city, Villeroi used the pretext of the bombardment being a reprisal for the bombardment of French cities along the English Channel by the English fleet. Within six hours, the letter announcing the bombardment affirmed this, in addition to asking the location of Max Emanuel's wife Theresa Kunegunda, the daughter of Polish King John III Sobieski, neutral in the conflict, as the King of France had forbidden that she be fired upon. The Prince of Berghes asked for a 24-hour extension to refer the request to stop bombarding the French coastal cities to William of Orange. He also asked Villeroi to consider the injustice of taking vengeance on Brussels, when the bombardments of French cities were entirely the fault of the King of England. Villeroi scoffed at this, saying the king "... has not given me the authority to enter into a treaty with the Prince of Orange."

=== Effect of bombardment ===
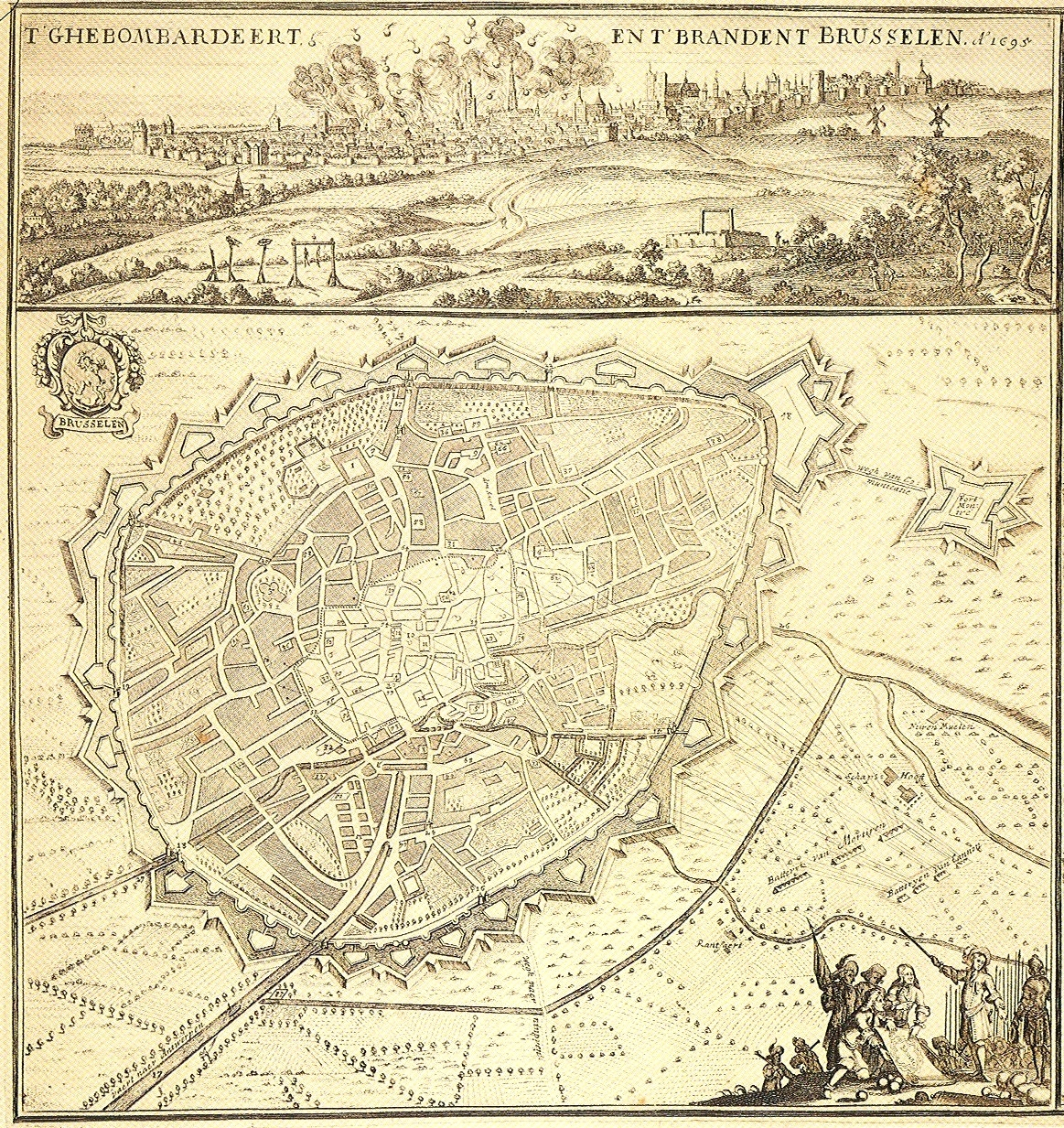
A contemporary map and illustration of the 1695 bombardment of Brussels and the subsequent fire. The white areas in the centre are the areas destroyed.

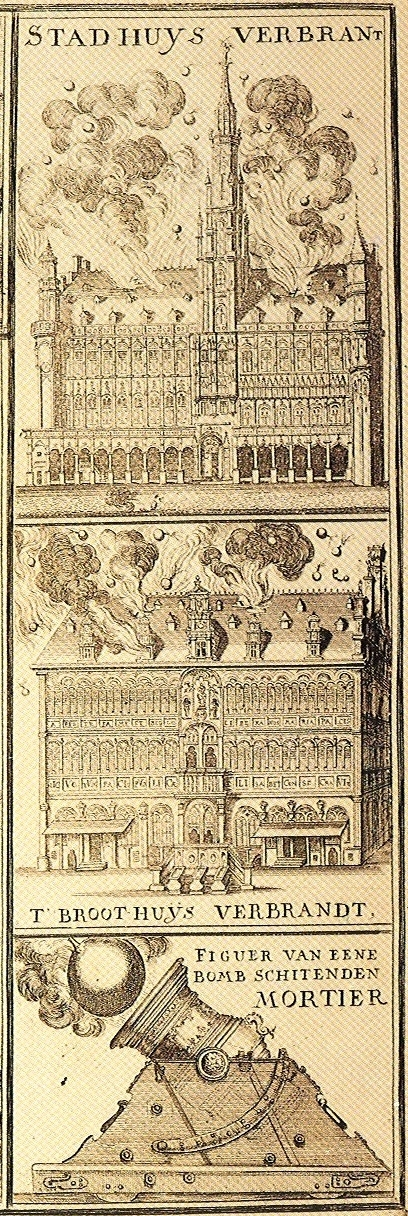
Top: The Town Hall burning Middle: The King's House burning Bottom: Diagram of a mortar

The French batteries began to fire just before seven in the evening. The first incendiary bombs and shells hit several houses, which caught fire, starting a fire which spread rapidly amongst the narrow alleys, which were frequently lined by houses and workshops which were partially made of wood.

All alone, three defensive batteries installed on the western ramparts of the city attempted to return fire, but they were short of gunpowder, ammunition and gunners. The few salvos of cannonballs, and later cobblestones, that the Brussels militias were able to get off were nonetheless able to kill around 35 French soldiers, but were not able to slow down the bombardment.

The city's authorities believed until the last minute that the worst could be avoided, and as such urged the populace to stay home with buckets of water, so as to be prepared to extinguish any fire and prevent its spread. So feeble a means of stopping the fire quickly proved useless, and the panicked residents tried to save their most precious belongings and fled to the heights of the city, east of the Senne valley. A helpless crowd watched the fire from the park at the ducal palace. By the middle of the night, the entire heart of the city was aflame, including the stone buildings of the Grand-Place and its surroundings, the Town Hall, abandoned by the authorities and whose spire was being used as a target by the French artillery, the King's House, the Recollet convent and the Church of St. Nicholas, whose bell fell on and crushed the neighbouring houses. Max Emmanuel, who had hastily returned from Namur with several troops, tried in vain to organize an effective resistance against the inferno and to maintain order.

On the morning of August 14, the barrage stopped for long enough for the French to resupply their batteries. Rumours that the French would be choosing new targets quickly spread, and in the confusion, the residents transported their belongings to the parts of the city which had already been hit. All of these were destroyed when the bombardment resumed.

When the bombardment resumed, the city was hammered even harder across an even larger area: on the north, towards the Mint and the Dominican convent, where large quantities of furniture, heirlooms, works of art and family archives had been stored and would soon be lost underneath the rubble. To the east, fear spread that the Church of St. Michael and St. Gudula (now Brussels' cathedral) would be destroyed, and its riches were evacuated. The area around what is now the Brussels-Central railway station and the Chapel of Mary Magdalene of Brussels were ablaze, and the Recollet convent, already hit the night before, was near completely destroyed. Destruction then came to the Saint John Hospital, and in the night, to the Chapel Church. By the morning of August 15, the entire city centre was an enormous brazier. To save the surrounding city by stopping the spread of the fire, Max Emmanuel used gunpowder to demolish numerous buildings to form a giant firebreak around the affected area, despite strong opposition by the buildings' owners.

The French batteries did not stop firing until the middle of the day, after 48 hours of bombardment.

=== Damage ===
As the populace had time to take refuge, the bombardment itself caused relatively few casualties, the number of deaths being small relative to other battles. Nevertheless, there are records of a man killed in the first salvo, of two lay brothers crushed under the ruins of their convent, four patients burned alive in Saint John Hospital, and of both residents trying to save their possessions and looters alike being buried alive under the rubble.

The material damage was documented by local artist Augustin Coppens whose own house had been destroyed and who made detailed drawings of the destruction of his hometown. 12 of these drawings were engraved, some with the help of his friend Richard van Orley and the plates published in Brussels later that year under the title Perspectives des Ruines de la Ville de Bruxelles. They were also reproduced in different sizes and colors by the German engraver Peter Schenk the Elder in Amsterdam and provide an important record of the impact of the bombardment.

Constantijn Huygens, William's Secretary for Dutch affairs, visited Brussels and in his diary entry for September 11, he writes that the 'ruin caused...was horrible...and in many places, the houses reduced to rubble.' Cultural and material losses were staggering, according to a number of different assessments. According to these, some 4000 to 5000 buildings were destroyed, representing a third of the buildings in the city. Much of this was in a contiguous area where every building was destroyed, visible as the white area in the map at the top of the page. There were, of course, numerous islands of destruction from the shells throughout the city.

The rubble in most cases completely covered and obscured even the location of the streets. Residences made out of wood with only the walls and chimneys made of stone had been largely consumed by the fires. The collection of buildings that survived consisted almost entirely of public buildings and churches, as those were made of stone and brick.

The city's artistic heritage, accumulated over centuries, was severely damaged by the bombardment. It is impossible to estimate the number of artistic works inside the buildings that were destroyed by the bombardment. Among the losses were Brusselois tapestries, furniture, and drawings and paintings by artists including Rogier van der Weyden, Rubens, Anthony van Dyck and Bernard van Orley. Much of the history of the city was also lost with the destruction of a large part of the archives.

The Papal nuncio estimated property losses at around 50 million florins, while the Spanish Ambassador in The Hague put it at 30 million. At this time, the annual rent for an ordinary house was between 120 and 150 florins, with a purchase price of around 2000 florins. This compares to a purchase price of about €200,000 today, giving a very rough estimate of between 3 and 5 billion euros in modern terms.

Ruins of Brussels after the bombardment

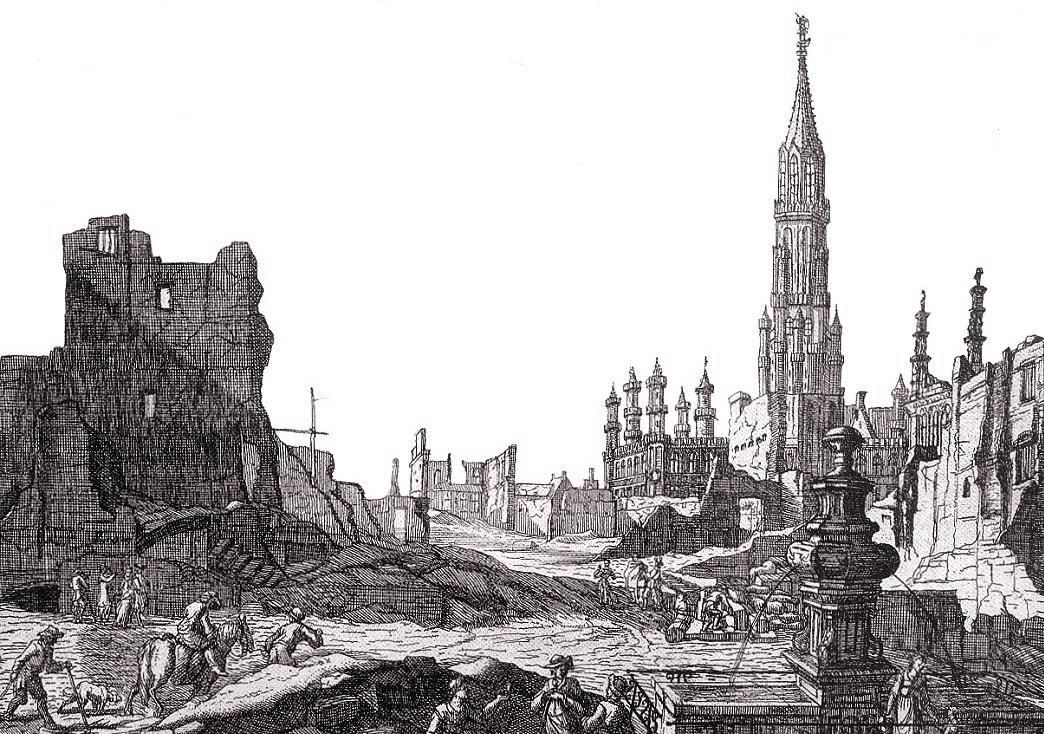
View from the Marché aux Herbes/Grasmarkt down the Rue de la Colline/Heuvelstraat to the Town Hall

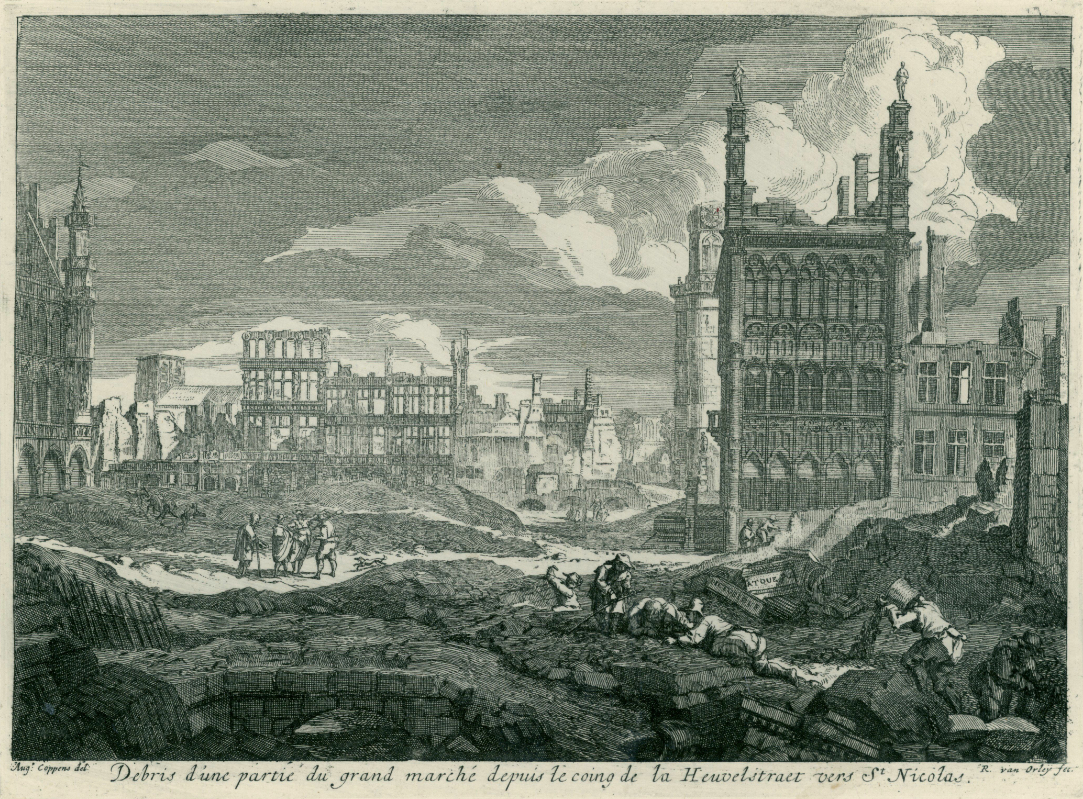
The Grand-Place from the corner of the Rue de la Colline towards the Church of St. Nicholas

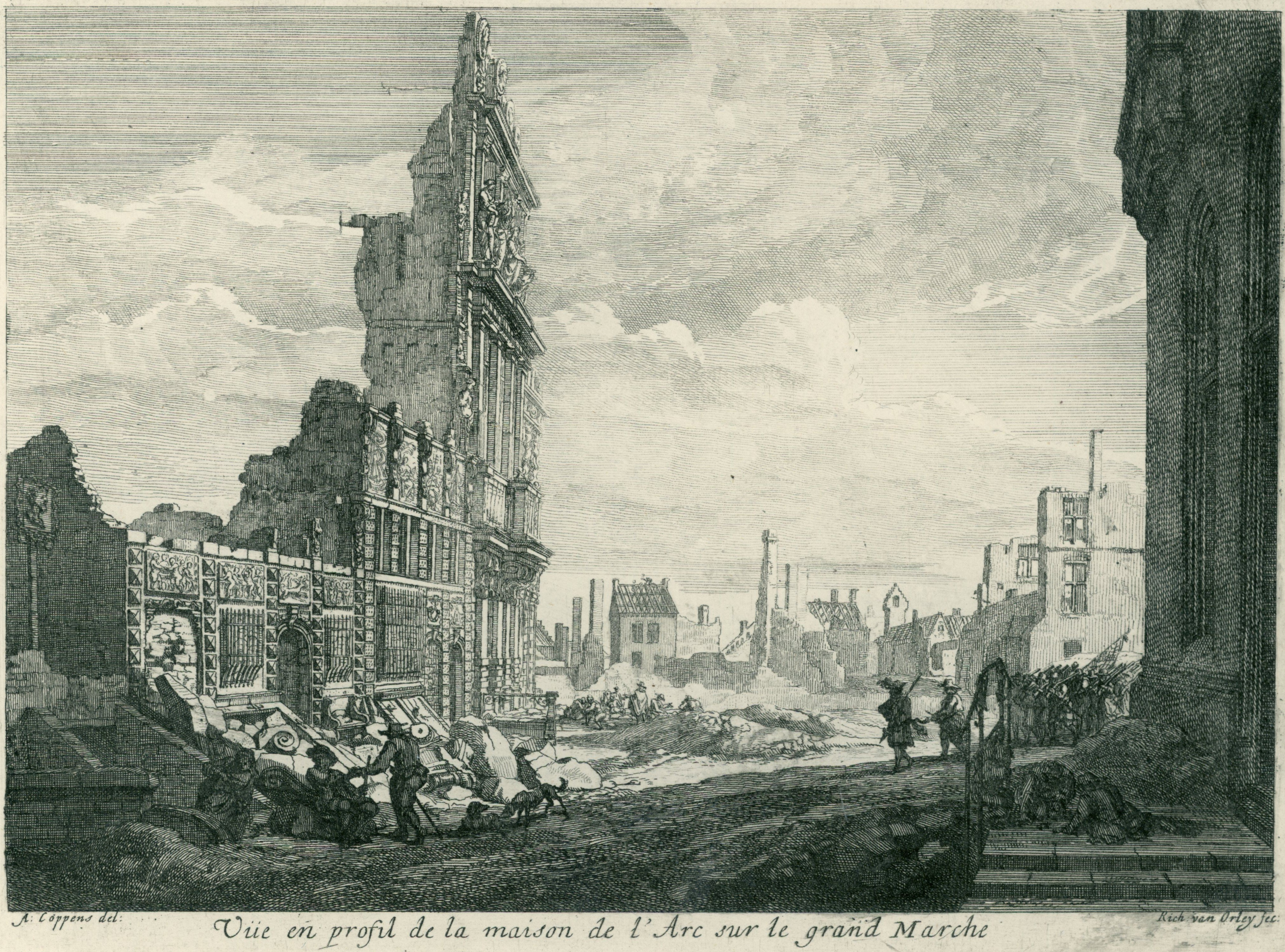
The surroundings of the Town Hall

== Aftermath ==
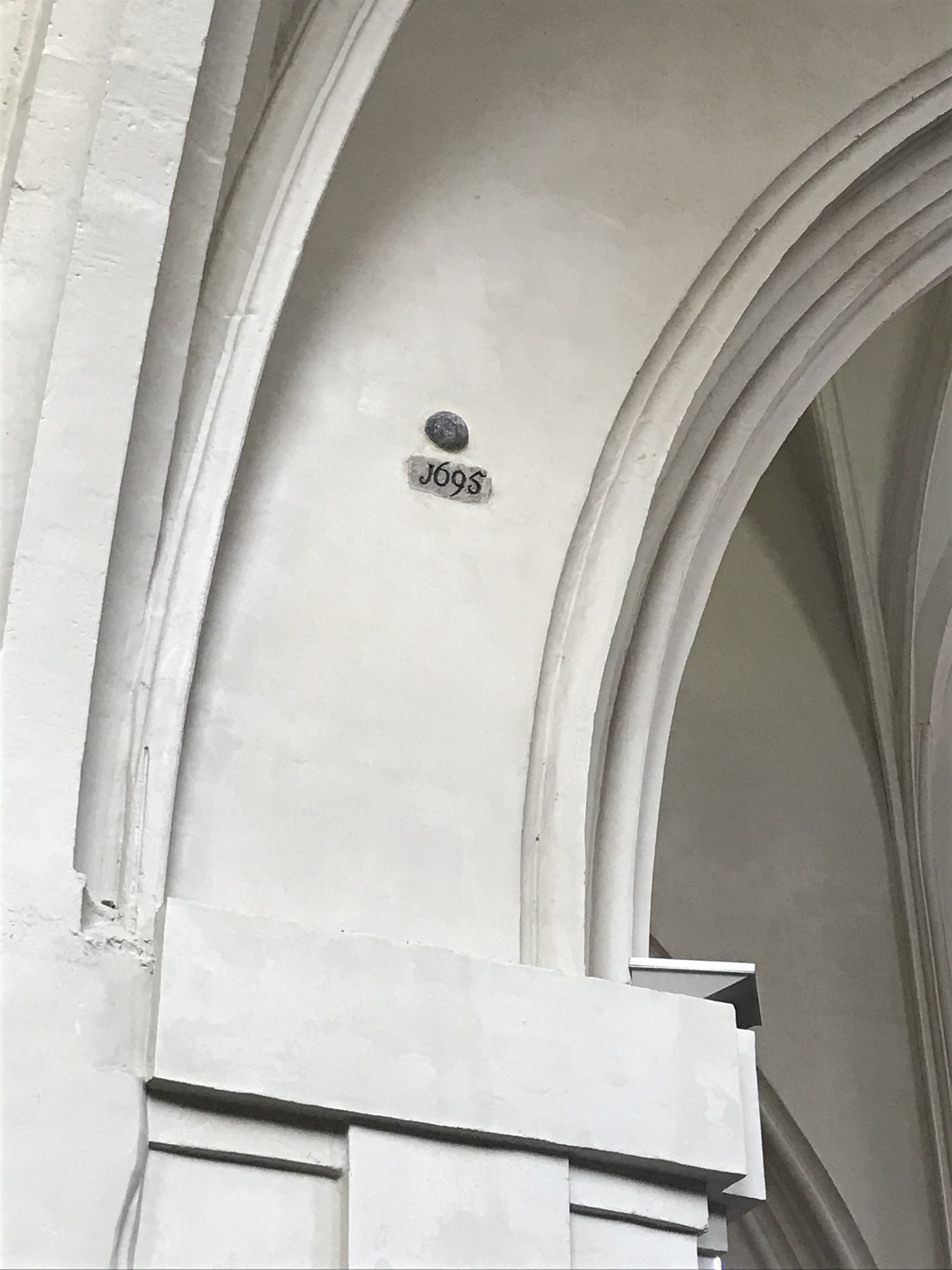
Cannonball in the walls of St. Nicholas dating from the bombardment

The French themselves seemed surprised at the success of the operation, which was well beyond what they had anticipated. Villeroi wrote: "The disorder that we have caused in this city is incredible, the people menace us with many threats of reprisal, I don't doubt they have the will to do so, but I don't see how they have the means." The French master of artillery wrote "I have been on many tours of duty, but I have never before seen so large a fire or so much desolation as there seems to be in that city." The young Duke of Berwick, a future Marshal of France who was present, disapproved, writing at the end of his life "A more appalling spectacle has never been seen, and nothing else comes as close to the sack of Troy."

The action was widely condemned throughout Europe, as it contravened an accepted convention of siege warfare, i.e. bombardments were used to smash a city's defenses, or destroy military infrastructure, rather than simply targeting the civilian population. Ministers of the Grand Alliance met in The Hague and vowed to avenge Brussels' destruction. The bombardment failed to divert the Allies from Namur, which surrendered on September 5 but caused considerable harm to the reputation of Louis XIV; Napoleon would later deem the bombardment "as barbarous as it was useless".

However, it has been suggested the Bombardment marked a fundamental shift in military tactics, where taking or holding fortifications had become the dominant form of warfare in this period. By demonstrating that fortified towns could no longer resist the massive firepower available in modern warfare, it led to a move away from siege warfare and into the direct confrontations advocated by Marlborough and others in the War of the Spanish Succession.

== Reconstruction ==
=== Initial measures ===
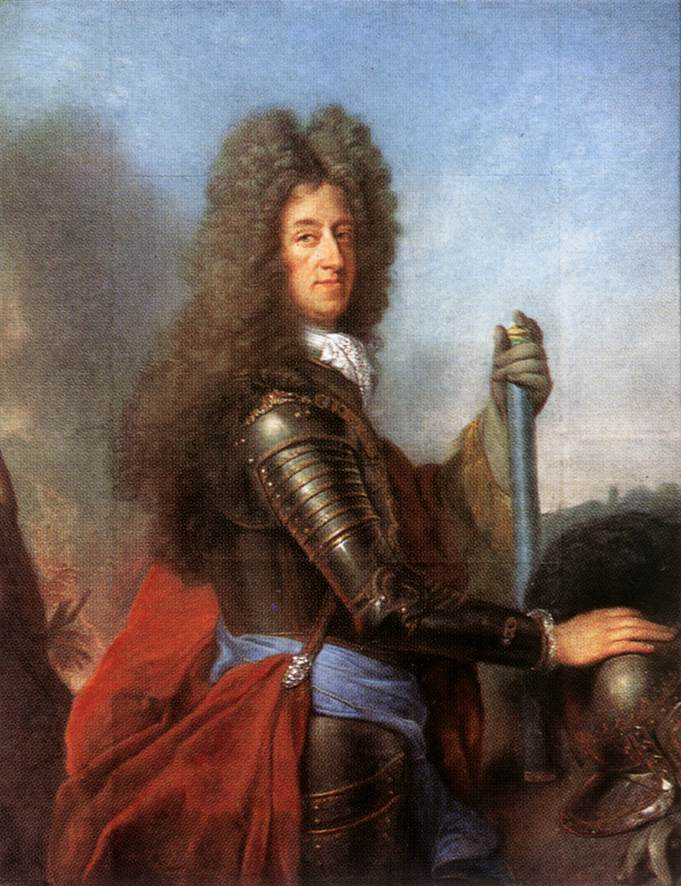
Maximilian II Emanuel, Elector of Bavaria and governor of the Spanish Netherlands

From the days following the bombardment into the following months, the different authorities of the city implemented a series of measures and regulations in order to attend to the most urgent problems and begin the reconstruction. The central government, headed by the governor, Maximilian II Emanuel, Elector of Bavaria, had a complex power-sharing agreement with the municipal government, called the Magistracy (French: magistrat, Dutch: magistraat), which represented local interests and retained much of the autonomy it had gained in the Middle Ages. This caused many jurisdictional conflicts, creating further problems.

The crucial problem of getting supplies to the city was resolved within a few days, thanks to neighbouring cities. Merchants were forbidden to bring commercial goods or beer into Brussels, thus allowing their transport capacities to be used to supply the city. Brussels appealed to other Brabantian cities, such as Leuven, Antwerp and Mechelen to send aid, which was done immediately, and convoys of food were hired and sent as soon as possible. The numerous residents without shelter camped in the palace's park. Authorities requisitioned what space they could in waiting for reconstruction, and rent increases were forbidden throughout the city. To put an end to looting and re-establish order, the city formed middle-class militias charged with patrolling the disaster-stricken areas. Maximilian II Emanuel posted sentries day and night, before joining in the siege of Namur.

It took several months to clear the debris. People of all classes were forced to help; they were forced to provide wagons and horses, and some were recruited for labour. To speed reconstruction, restrictions were lifted and foreign workers were allowed to come to the city and freely work in reconstruction for a period of two years, although all workers were forbidden to demand higher wages than they had received before the bombardment. The governor ordered free entry into the city of building supplies, and the prices were to be frozen for two years. By opening Brussels to the outside commercially, the guilds' monopoly was renounced and opportunities for profiting from the disaster were reduced, in order to bring the city back to normal as quickly as possible.

=== Two proposals ===
A few months following the bombardment, two opposing visions for the city emerged. Maximilian II Emanuel, an ambitious and enlightened prince, envisioned using the reconstruction as an opportunity to modify the layout and architectural style of the city. Unlike the numerous transient Spanish nobles which had preceded him in the unprestigious post of Governor of the Spanish Netherlands, Maximilian II Emanuel actually became quite involved in the assignment. Backed by Emperor Leopold I, he dreamt of making the Spanish Netherlands his own hereditary state. His plan was to transform the medieval city into a city of the new Baroque style, having been influenced by his numerous trips to the imperial court in Vienna, and in his travels to Milan and Turin. Turin in particular was characterized by its logical street layout, with straight avenues offering long, uninterrupted views flanked by buildings of a uniform size. Maximilian II Emanuel advised in the reconstruction plans that buildings and streets be built in uniform proportions so as to improve the aesthetics of the city. He also insisted on this point when dealing with the Magistracy, saying "..we strongly hope that some order and uniformity has been observed in the buildings, and ... for the beauty and convenience of the city, that the streets which were formerly too narrow have now been enlarged."

For the residents of Brussels, however, the priorities were completely different. A rapid reconstruction was vital to allow economic activities to resume and to prevent an exodus of the population. The city's authorities, who had few resources, did not have the means to finance grandiose proposals. No financial aid from Spain or the governor could be expected, as their resources were dedicated to the war effort. The solution thus involved frugality and effectiveness, based on tradition, and the re-use of materials and surviving foundations. The residents and the guilds did not look favourably on the imposition of a new, foreign, architectural style. Local architects and artisans, with their better understanding of locally available materials and needs, still made attractive buildings, although they bore no resemblance to the Baroque style. The weakness of the central government and the governor's absence due to the war during the first stages of reconstruction, in addition to the strength of the local upper classes, resulted in the structure of the city being kept largely the same, a situation similar to that after the Great Fire of London in 1666.

After the outbreak of the War of the Spanish Succession in 1701, Maximilian II Emanuel quit his post as governor. Formerly having been allied with Austria and the Holy Roman Empire, he allied Bavaria with France in the conflict. No longer governor, his visions for Brussels were not enacted. What he did build was largely dedicated to symbolizing his power. The first Theatre of La Monnaie was commissioned by him, and designed by Venetian architects. He envisioned rebuilding the Grand-Place with a uniform facade, although this would be done on only one of the sides of the square, now the House of the Dukes of Brabant.

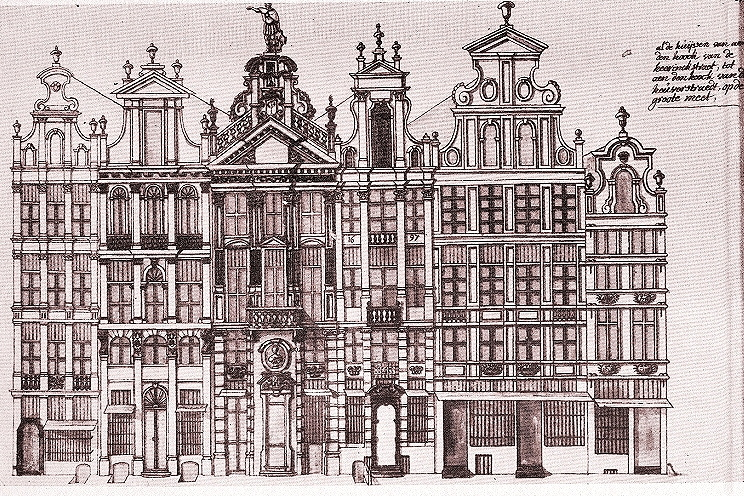
Guildhalls on the Grand-Place, 1729

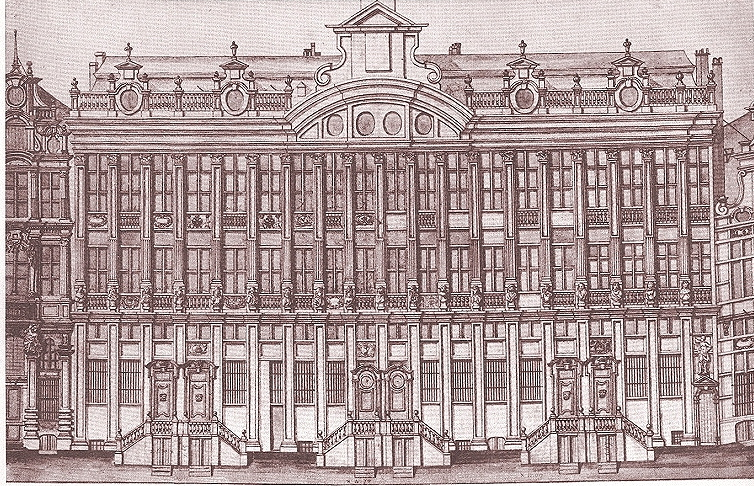
House of the Dukes of Brabant, 1729. Compare its uniformity to the other guildhalls.

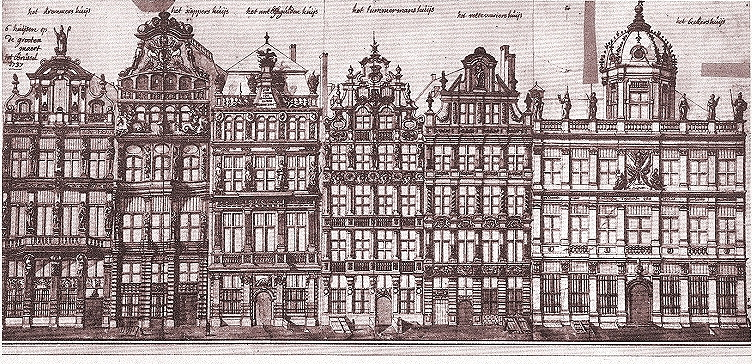
Guildhalls, 1729

=== Reconstruction of the city centre ===
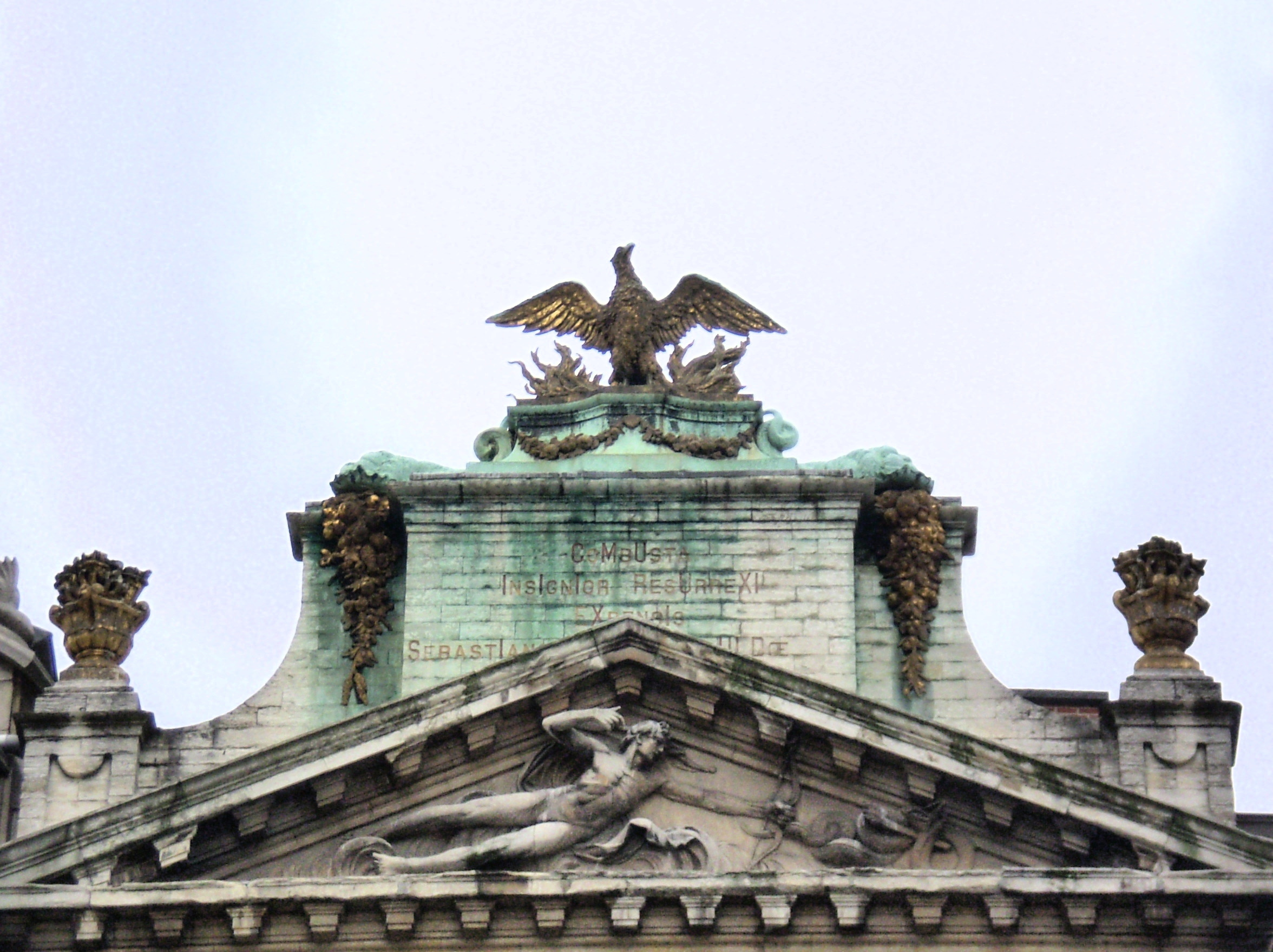
Phoenix rising from its ashes on the Grand-Place's La Louve guildhall, symbol of the city's reconstruction

Although the general layout of the city was conserved, it was not completely identical. Despite the necessity of rapid reconstruction and the lack of financial means, authorities took several measures to improve traffic flow, sanitation and the general aesthetics of the city. Many streets were made as wide as possible to improve traffic flow. New regulations were put in place, adding to existing ones preventing cellar doors, steps and wares from spilling into the street. Thatched roofs, wooden canopies and upper floors projecting into the street had all been illegal before the fire, but unenforced. Any building that did not conform to regulations was to be demolished.

The reconstruction of the Grand-Place and the adjacent streets, long the political and economic centre of the city, was an object of particular care. The municipal government funded the repair of the Town Hall, raising the money by selling houses and land. The guilds were encouraged to rebuild their guildhalls with particular care, and any proposal required approval by the Magistracy before it could be carried out. Although the economic and political power of the guilds was in decline, the guilds lavishly decorated their guildhalls, often putting themselves in debt for decades to do so. Keeping a strong resemblance was important, and the guildhalls were rebuilt using a multitude of decorative styles and individualizations, while maintaining a remarkable harmony, despite the ostensibly clashing combination of Gothic, Baroque and Louis XIV styles. Five years after the disaster, Brussels was almost entirely rebuilt, more beautiful than before the fire. The reconstruction was of an exceptional speed, and took place in an atmosphere of hope for sustained peace following the fall of the Citadel of Namur and the Treaty of Ryswick, both of which were extensively celebrated in the city.

== Notes and references ==
=== Bibliography ===
- Culot, Maurice; Hennaut, Eric; Demanet, Marie; Mierop, Caroline (1992). Le bombardement de Bruxelles par Louis XIV et la reconstruction qui s'ensuivit, 1695–1700 (in French). Brussels: AAM éditions. ISBN 978-2-87143-079-7.
- (in French) Victor-Gaston Martiny, Bruxelles, architecture civile et militaire avant 1900, éditions J.-M. Collet, Braine-l’Alleud, 1992 (réédition augmentée de la première version de 1980), 100 p. ISBN 2-87367-007-X.
