= Jan van Orley =

Flemish painter, draughtsman, printmaker

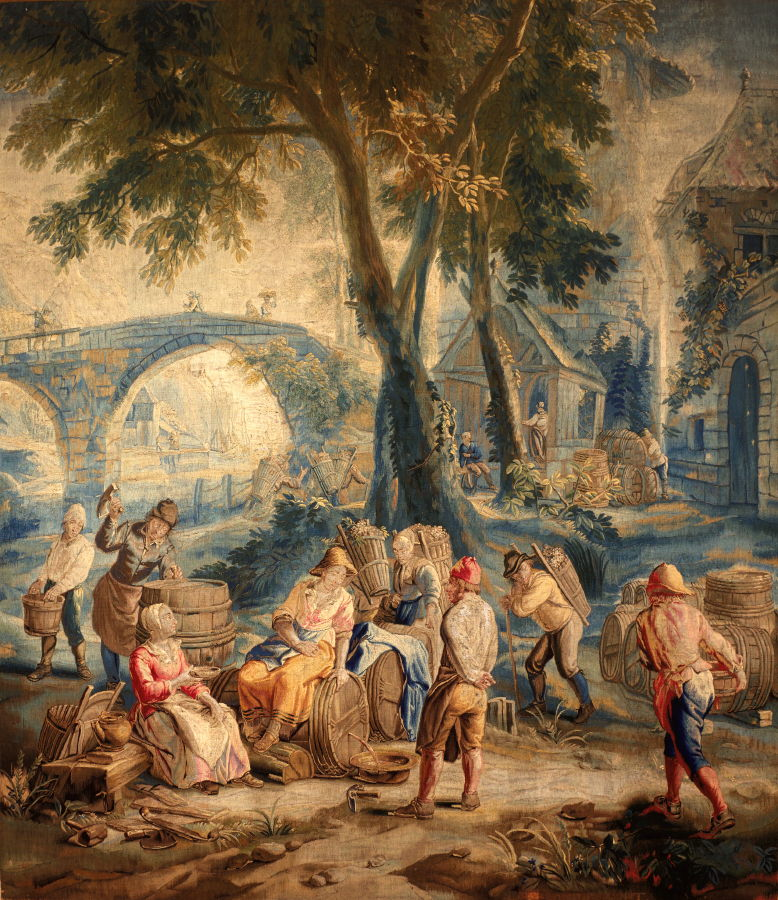
The Vintage, tapestry

Jan van Orley or Jan van Orley II (4 January 1665, in Brussels – 22 February 1735, in Brussels) was a Flemish painter, draughtsman, printmaker and designer of tapestries. Van Orley was one of the major figures of Flemish tapestry design in the late 17th and early 18th century.

After the destruction by French troops of a large number of religious and civic buildings during the Bombardment of Brussels in 1695 he obtained many commissions for religious paintings to redecorate the churches in Brussels that had been destroyed by the French onslaught.

== Life ==
Jan van Orley was born in Brussels in 1665 and trained with his father Pieter (called Siret), who was a landscape artist and miniaturist. He was the younger brother of Richard van Orley who was a prominent engraver and painter. The van Orley family was a leading artistic dynasty and the profession was passed on from father to son over the centuries. Bernard van Orley (1488-1541) was the most famous scion of the family.

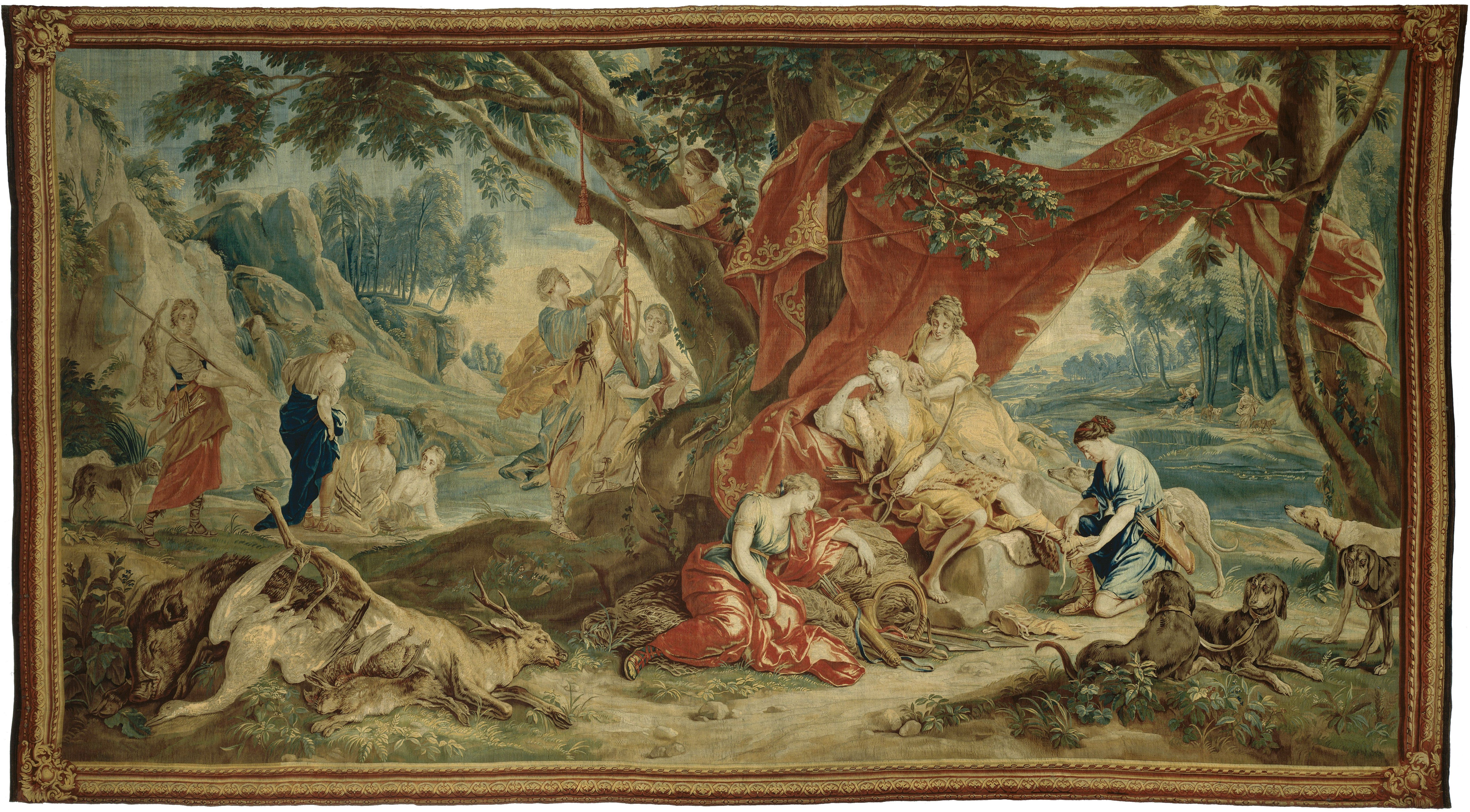
Resting Diana, from the 'Triumph of the Gods' tapestry series

Unlike his brother Richard or his contemporary Victor Honoré Janssens, Jan van Orley never studied or lived in Italy. Jan is mainly recorded as having worked in Brussels.

Jan van Orley started his career as a miniaturist. On 13, 14 and 15 August 1695 French troops carried out the first artillery bombardment on a civil population in modern history. This event, known as the Bombardment of Brussels, caused the destruction of a third of the buildings in Brussels, including civil and religious buildings. The centre of the city was almost entirely destroyed by fire. After the destruction, Brussels' authorities and institutions commenced rebuilding immediately and places of worship, public buildings and guild halls arose from the ashes. This led to many commissions for artists to replace destroyed artworks. Jan van Orley and Victor Honoré Janssens were the principal history painters in Brussels who benefited from this situation. Jan van Orley succeeded in securing commissions for about 30 paintings for the decoration of religious and civic buildings. These included a Crucifixion for the chapel of the Black Nuns and a Christ among the Doctors (St Nicolas Church, Brussels). Another painter who received many commissions to redecorate the Brussels churches was Zeger Jacob van Helmont and some works of van Helmont were earlier misattributed to Jan van Orley.

== Work ==
=== General ===
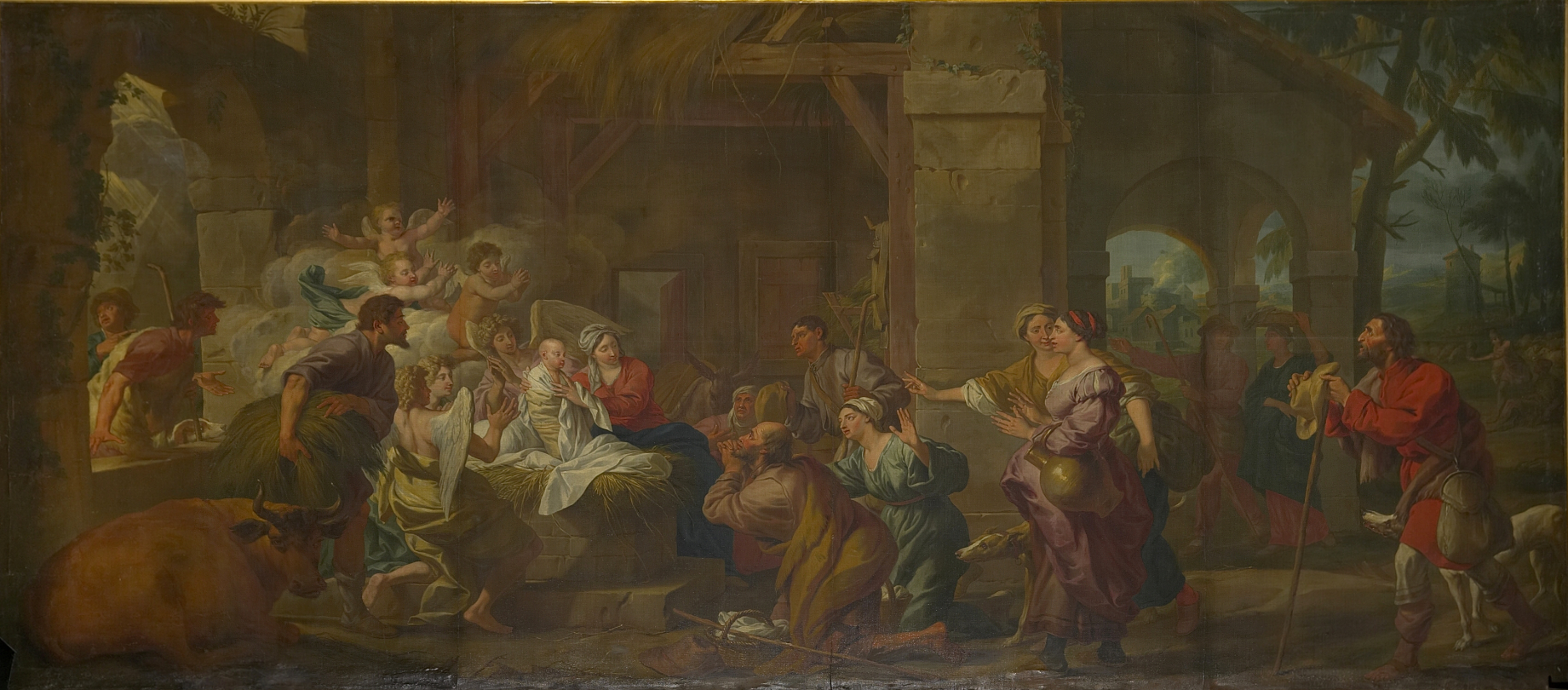
Adoration of the shepherds, oil on canvas

Jan van Orley was a prolific artist and left an extensive oeuvre in a wide variety of techniques including painting, drawing, printmaking and tapestry design. His principal subjects are history and mythology.

Van Orley's work marks the transition from the 17th century Baroque style to the classicism of the 18th century. Jan's work was dependent on Flemish Baroque and French academic Classicist painting of the 17th century. In particular, the influence of the work of Peter Paul Rubens, Charles Le Brun and Gérard de Lairesse are visible in his work.

Van Orley also executed a number of portraits of members of the royal families of the Spanish and Austrian regime.

=== Tapestry design ===
Jan van Orley is regarded as one of the last important Flemish tapestry designers. In the early 1700s Jan van Orley and Augustin Coppens were the leading team of tapestry designers for the Reydams Leyniers tapestry workshop in Brussels. The two artists often collaborated on tapestry cartoons with Coppens designing the landscapes and Jan van Orley adding the staffage. The pair jointly created a neo-Baroque style for the Brussels workshops. In their works of the early 1700s, van Orley and Coppens developed mythological, romance and genre scenes which gave of a lighter spirit and tone to tapestry designs. They contributed to the early 18th century shift of the Brussels workshops towards more playful forms, away from the severe Baroque historical and mythological subjects. This lighter style was referred to as the Régence style. This involved a more relaxed narrative in the tapestries and sometimes the loose compilation of associated subjects, chosen according to a client's request.

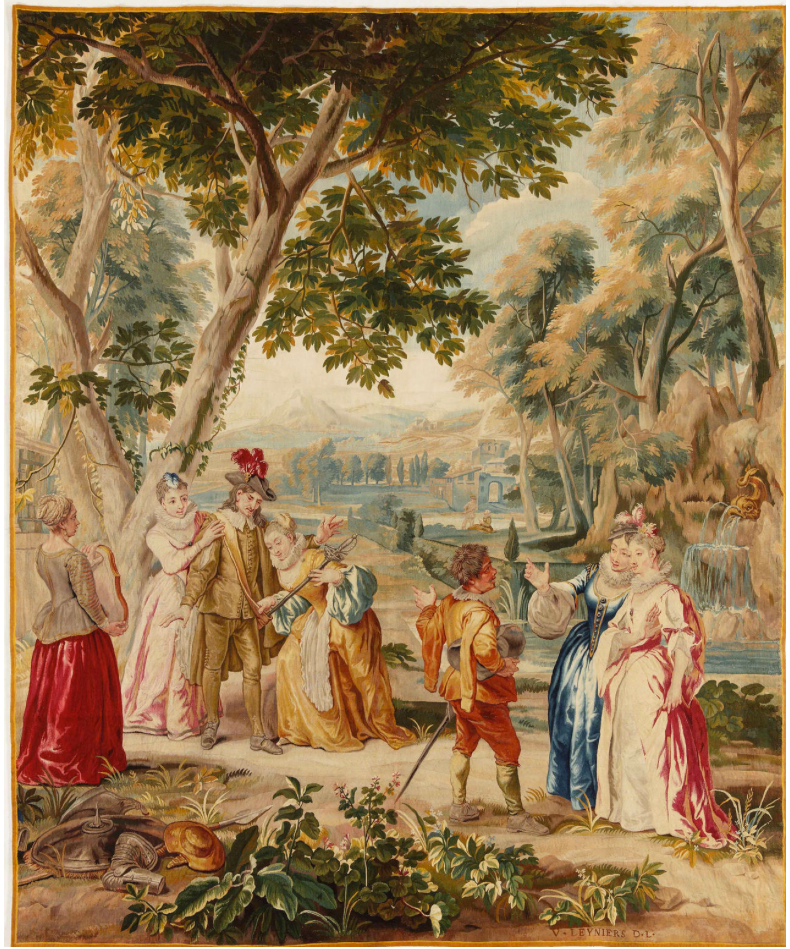
False Micomicon princess imploring Don Quixote, tapestry

Jan van Orley and Coppens contributed together on a series on The Triumphs of the Gods for the Leyniers workshop. The two artists were the last to rework the famous Acts of the Apostles cartoons of Raphael. The marquis of Prié who was the acting governor of the Austrian Netherlands had brought watercolor copies of seven of the Raphael tapestries from Rome to Brussels. Van Orley and Coppens were commissioned by Urbanus Leyniers to turn the copies into new tapestry cartoons. The first edition of the tapestry series was woven in 1727 for the duke of Norfolk. Other series on which Jan van Orley worked for the Reydams Leyniers workshop are the 'Story of Don Quixote', "Teniers' and the "Story of Telemachus II'. The cartoons created by van Orley were still used by the Brussels workshops many years after his death as is shown by the fact that the design by van Orley and Coppens for a 'Diana resting' tapestry was still used for a new edition in 1768.

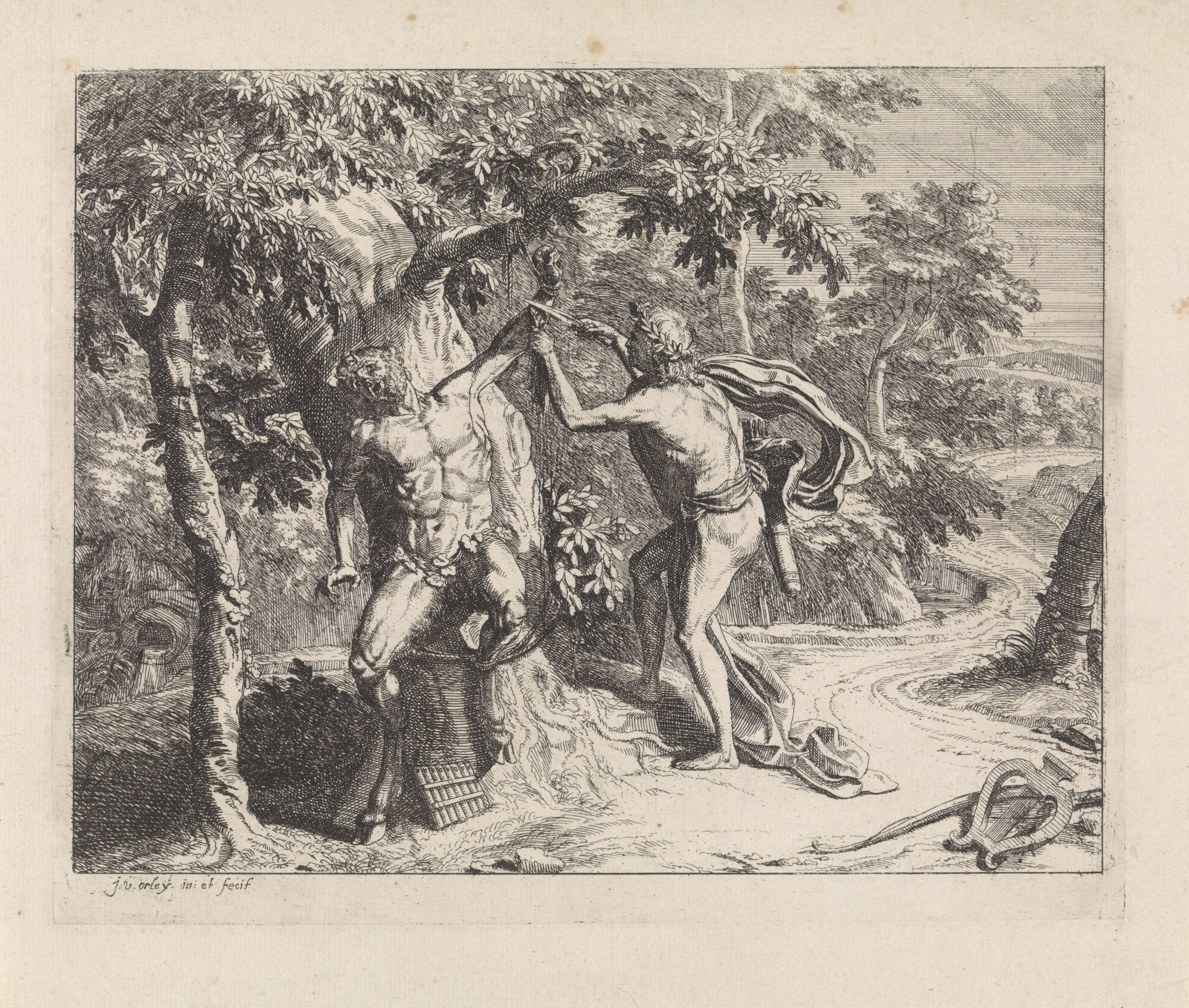
Apollo skins Marsyas, engraving.

In later years van Orley worked for other workshops such as the Jasper van der Borcht workshop for which he produced the models for the Life of Christ series realized in 1731. The set of 8 tapestries together with the cartoons, which were painted in oil on canvas, are now in the St. Salvator's Cathedral in Bruges. The influence of the work of Charles Le Brun is evident in the series. Altogether van Orley and Coppens collaborated on designs for at least 15 tapestry series and these were provided to various workshops such as de Vos, Auwercx, Le Clerc, van den Hecke, Reydams-Leyniers and van der Borcht.

Jan also collaborated with his brother Richard on tapestry designs for the local tapestry workshops.

=== Graphic work ===
Jan van Orley was active as a graphic artist who produced a number of prints after his own designs. His brother Richard engraved a series of 28 plates after his designs on the history of the New Testament.

== Sources ==
- Thomas P. Campbell, Pascal-François Bertrand, Jeri Bapasola, 'Tapestry in the Baroque: Threads of Splendor', Metropolitan Museum of Art, 2007
- Guy Delmarcel, 'Flemish Tapestry from the 15th to the 18th Century', Lannoo Uitgeverij, 1 January 1999
