= Richard van Orley =

Flemish painter, draughtsman, printmaker (1663–1732)

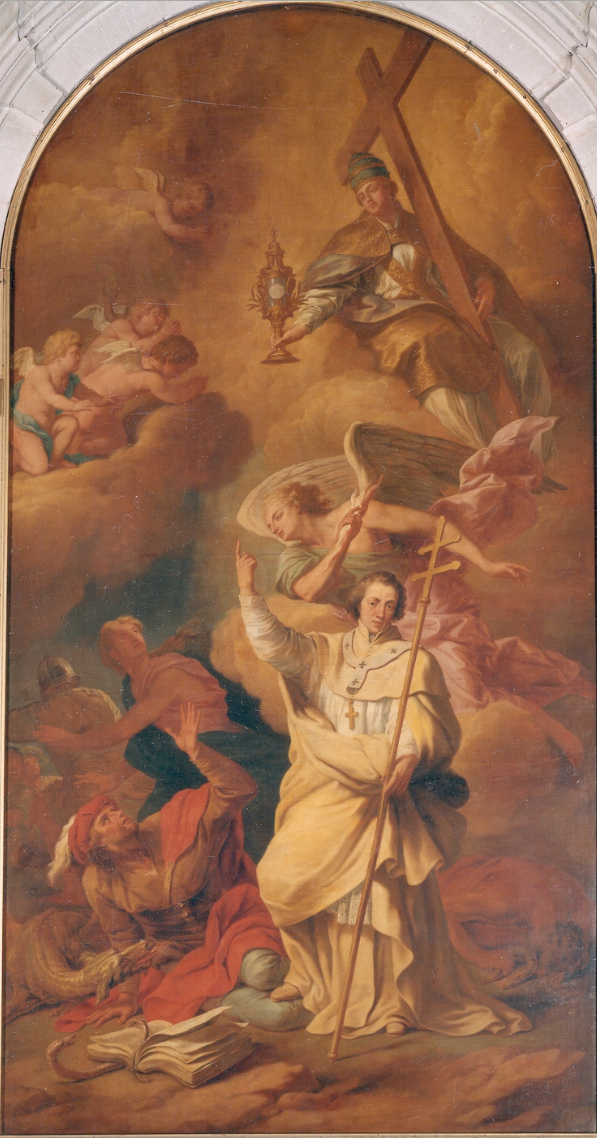
Glorification of St. Norbert

Richard van Orley or Richard van Orley II (16 July 1663, in Brussels – 20 June 1732, in Brussels) was a Flemish painter, draughtsman, printmaker. His collaboration with his brother Jan van Orley, who was one of the major figures of Flemish tapestry design in the late 17th and early 18th century, as a tapestry cartonnier is not proven. For an essential study on the artist, see: Alain Jacobs, Richard van Orley Bruxelles 1663–1732, Brussels, Royal Library 2003, 173 pages (original text in French and also exists translated into Dutch). Richard van Orley was an important engraver and is particularly known for his prints after drawings by Augustin Coppens documenting the devastating effect of the Bombardment of Brussels by French troops in 1695.

== Life ==
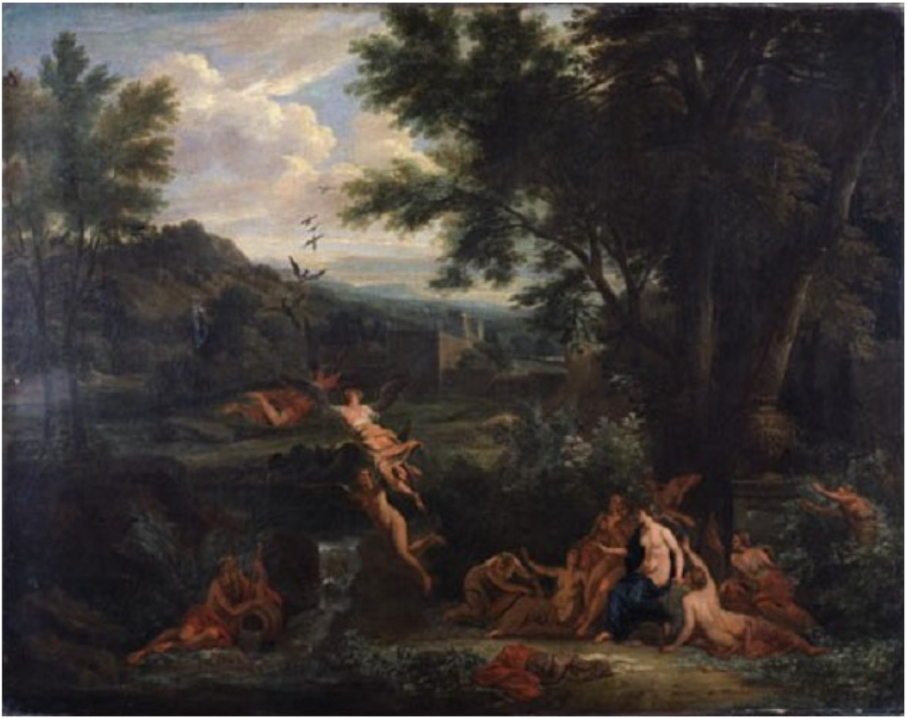
Pierides Changed into Magpies

Richard van Orley was born in Brussels in 1663 and trained with his father Pieter (called Siret), who was a landscape artist and miniaturist. He was the older brother of Jan van Orley who was a prominent tapestry designer. The van Orley family was a leading artistic dynasty and the profession was passed on from father to son over the centuries. Bernard van Orley (1488-1541) was the most famous member of the family.

It is assumed that Richard van Orley studied or lived for some time in Italy because he left a series of drawings of the Development of Rome (Royal Library of Belgium, Brussels). Apart from this presumed stay in Italy van Orley is mainly recorded as having worked in Brussels. He may also have been a tax collector in Brussels. Van Orley was able to achieve a reputation as an accomplished artist during his lifetime.

Van Orley died on 20 June 1732 as a bachelor.

== Work ==
=== General ===
Richard van Orley was a prolific artist who left an extensive oeuvre in a wide variety of techniques. About 500 drawings, 70 original engravings and 30 miniatures have been inventoried. His principal subjects are history and mythology drawn from stories in the bible, novels, the classics and spiritual meditation booklets.

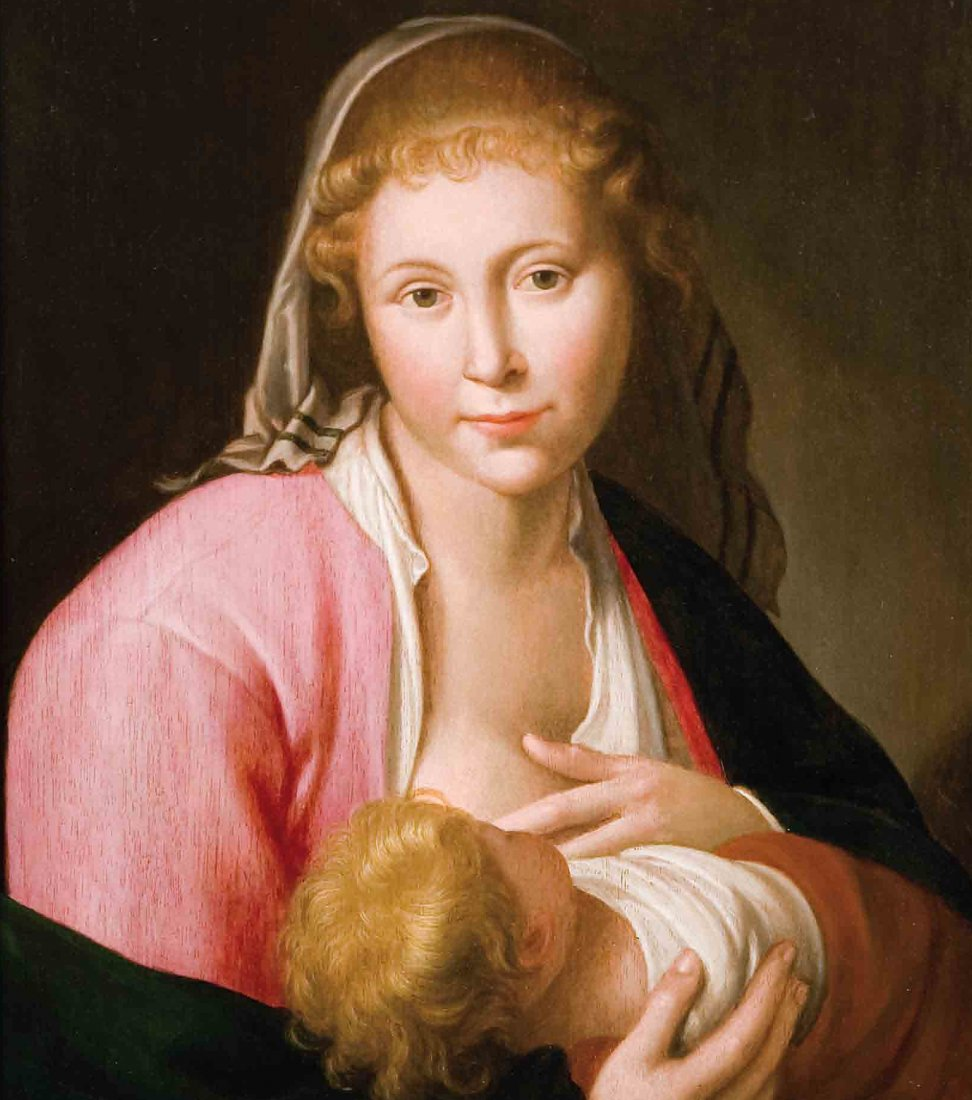
Madonna and Child

Richard collaborated with his brother on tapestry designs for the local tapestry workshops. The two brothers' work marks the transition from the 17th century Baroque style to the classicism of the 18th century.

=== Drawings ===
Richard van Orley created a large number of drawings many of which were original designs for his prints. He made 67 drawings of the Development of Rome (Royal Library of Belgium,). Another series of 16 drawings (Ghent, City Library) depicts the Life of Charles V.

=== Graphic work ===
Richard van Orley was a very gifted graphic artist who produced many prints after his own designs or after those of other artists, including famous Flemish artists. An example is his The drunk Silenus after a painting of Rubens. Many of his drawings were designs for prints.

He also engraved a series of 28 plates after designs by his brother on the history of the New Testament.

=== Views of the Brussels ruins ===
A collaborative project with his friend Augustin Coppens brought Richard van Orley fame in 1695. On 13, 14 and 15 August 1695 French troops carried out the first artillery bombardment on a civil population in modern history. This event, known as the Bombardment of Brussels, caused the destruction of a third of the buildings in Brussels.

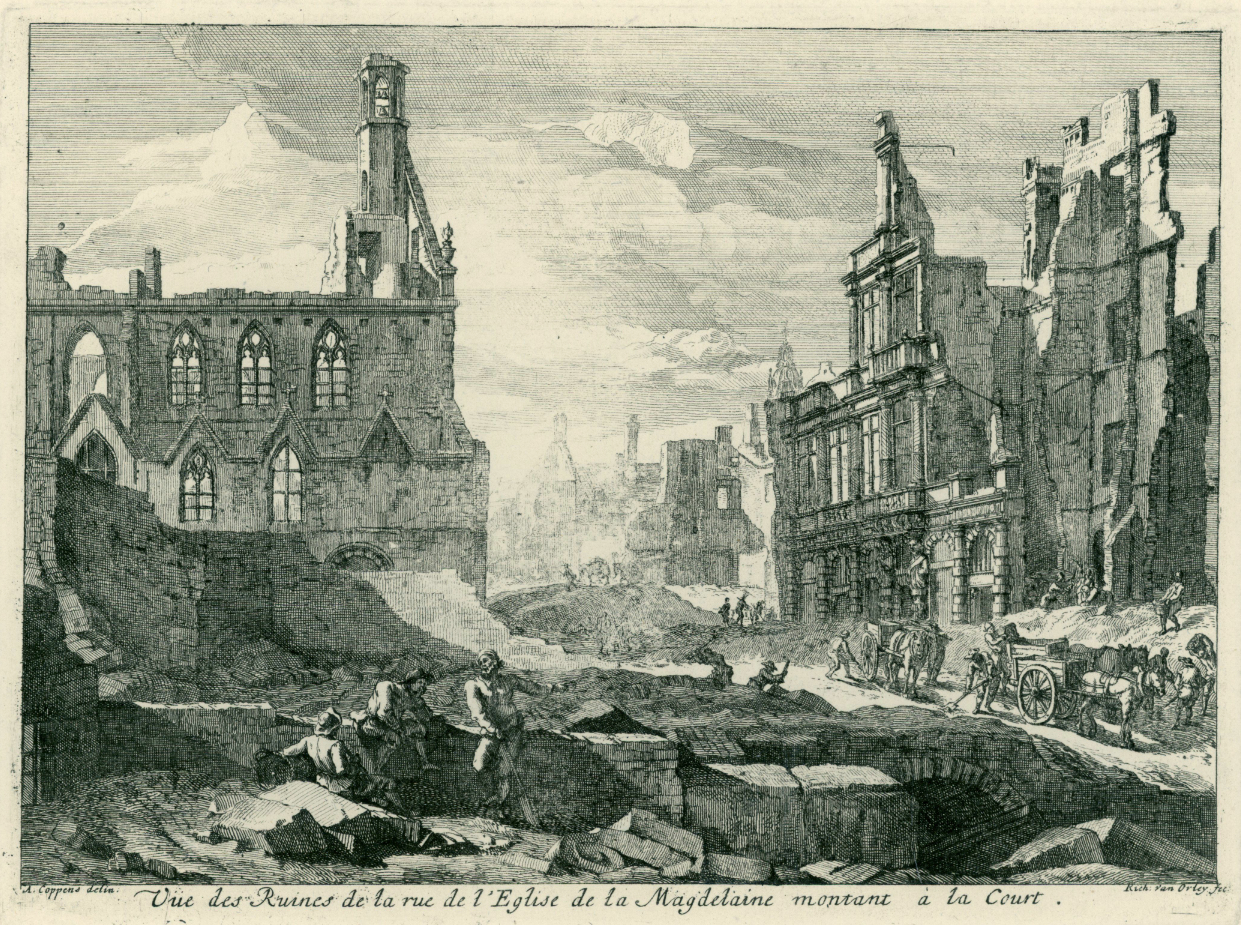
A view of the ruins from Magdalene church street ascending to the Court

The young Augustin Coppens whose home had been destroyed took to the streets of Brussels and documented the horrible destruction of his hometown. Coppens turned 12 of his drawings into prints, of which 7 were engraved by Richard van Orley. The plates were published the same year in Brussels under the title Perspectives des Ruines de la Ville de Bruxelles.

The publication was widely circulated and assured both artists' fame. The prints were also reproduced in different sizes and colors by the German engraver Peter Schenk the Elder in Amsterdam. The prints have an important documentary value by providing a detailed record of the impact of the bombardment.

=== Paintings ===
Richard van Orley's paintings are less well-known. It is possible that in the beginning of his career he was influenced by the Utrecht Caravaggisti and Vermeer's portrait paintings as is shown in a signed painting of the Madonna and Child (Auctioned at Live Auctioneers). The Museum of Fine Arts in Ghent holds two compositions by van Orley with mythological scenes set in lush Classicist landscape.

Richard van Orley created a series of paintings on the life of Saint Norbert for Tongerlo Abbey, only one of which survives (Royal Museum of Fine Arts Antwerp). He created another series of four religious compositions on the same theme for Grimbergen Abbey. He also painted a Portrait of abbot Augustinus Willem Van Eeckhout who commissioned this series.

Van Orley created a number of detailed gouaches, mostly on parchment.

== Notes ==
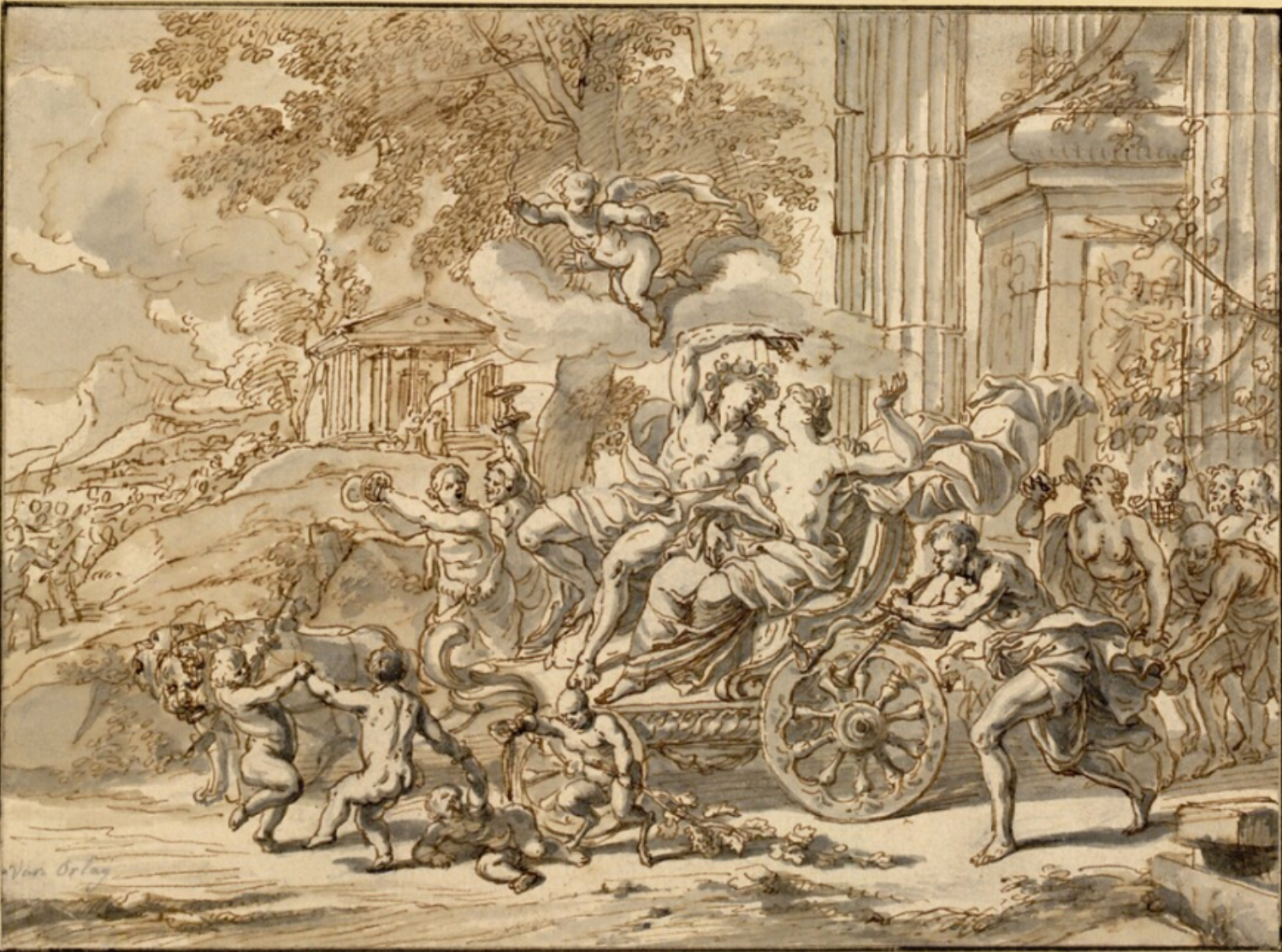
Bacchus and Ariadne
