= 1503 in art =

Events from the year 1503 in art.

== Events ==
- Leonardo da Vinci probably begins painting the Mona Lisa in Florence
- Giuliano Bugiardini joins the painter's guild in Florence
- First record of Matthias Grünewald painting

== Works ==
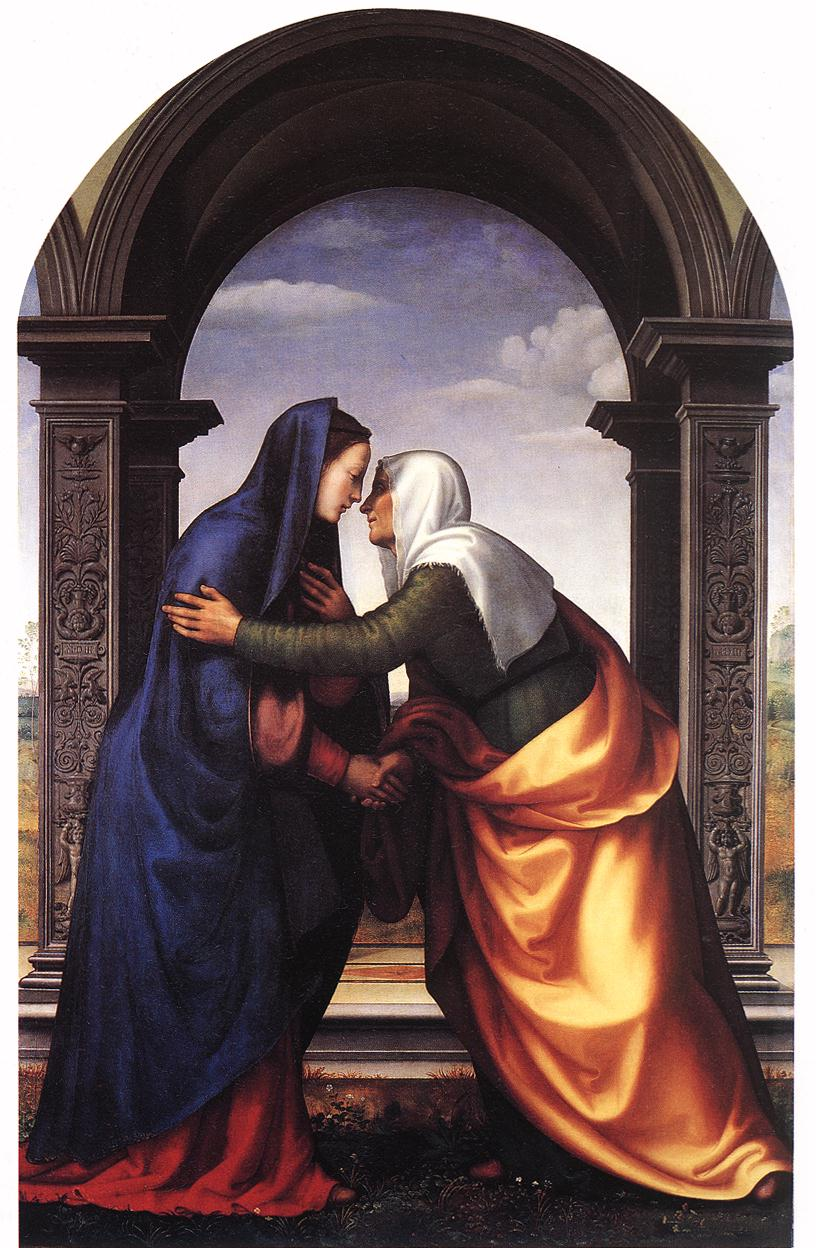
Albertinelli, The Visitation

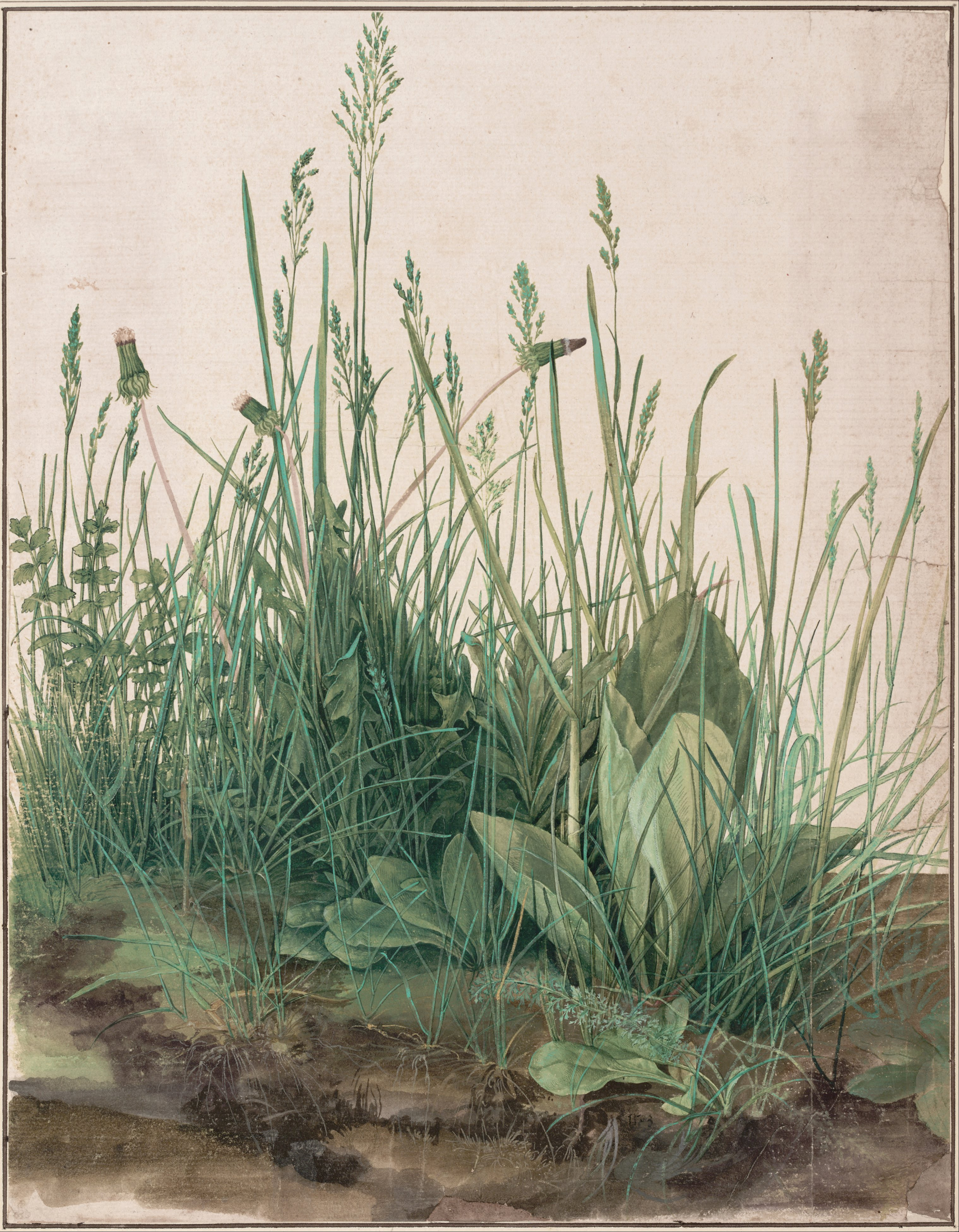
Dürer, Great Piece of Turf

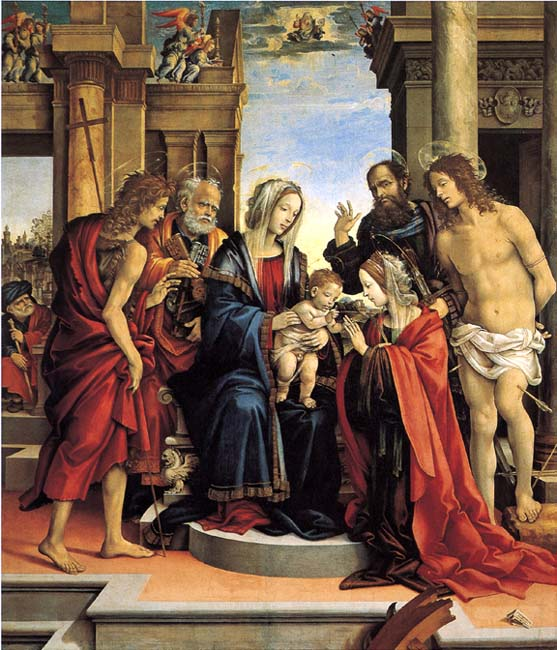
Filippino Lippi, Marriage of St. Catherine

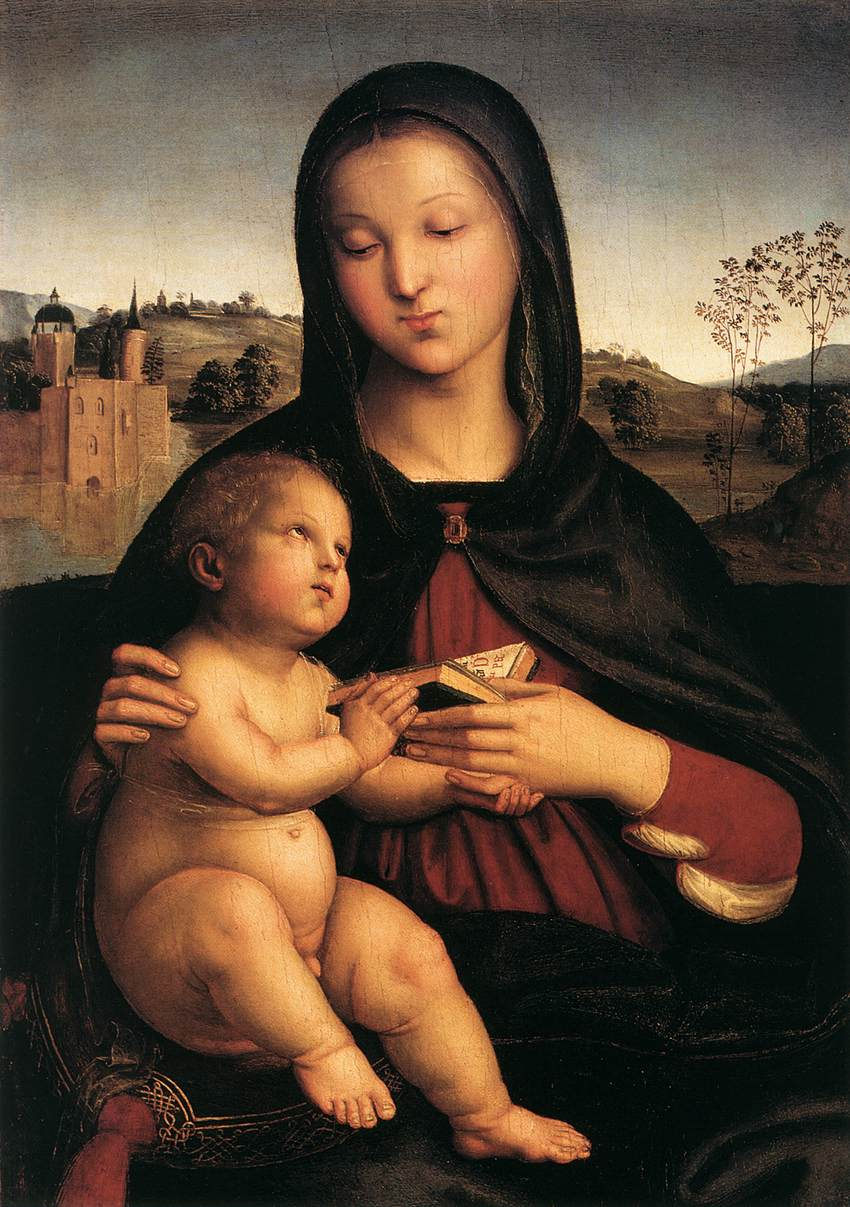
Raphael, Madonna and Child with the Book
- Mariotto Albertinelli – The Visitation of the Virgin
- Albrecht Dürer – Great Piece of Turf (Das große Rasenstück, watercolor)
- Filippino Lippi – Mystical Marriage of St. Catherine
- Pietro Perugino – Combat of Love and Chastity
- Raphael – Madonna and Child with the Book (approximate date)
- Luca Signorelli – Portrait of Vitelozzo Vitelli
- Master of Frankfurt – Holy Kinship (Historical Museum, Frankfurt)
- Madonna of Laroque, perhaps by Leonardo da Vinci

== Births ==
- Agnolo di Cosimo, Italian Mannerist painter from Florence (died 1572)
- Pedro Campaña, Flemish painter of the Renaissance period (died 1586)
- Paul Dax, Austrian artist (died 1561)
- Parmigianino, Italian Mannerist painter and printmaker (died 1540)
- Augustin Hirschvogel, German artist, mathematician, and cartographer known primarily for his etchings (died 1553)
- Giovanni Battista Scultori, Italian painter, sculptor and engraver (died 1575)
- Michele Tosini, Italian painter of the Renaissance and Mannerist period, who worked in Florence (died 1577)

== Deaths ==
- Israhel van Meckenem, German printmaker and goldsmith (born 1445)
- 1502/1503: Giovanni Donato da Montorfano, Italian painter (born 1460)
