= 1561 in art =

Events from the year 1561 in art.

== Events ==
- Sculptors Bernhard and Arnold Abel are recorded as working at the Imperial Court in Vienna.
- Juan Bautista Vázquez the Elder moves to Seville to complete an altarpiece, and remains there to work.
- Michelangelo ceases work on the Pietà Firenze.

== Works ==
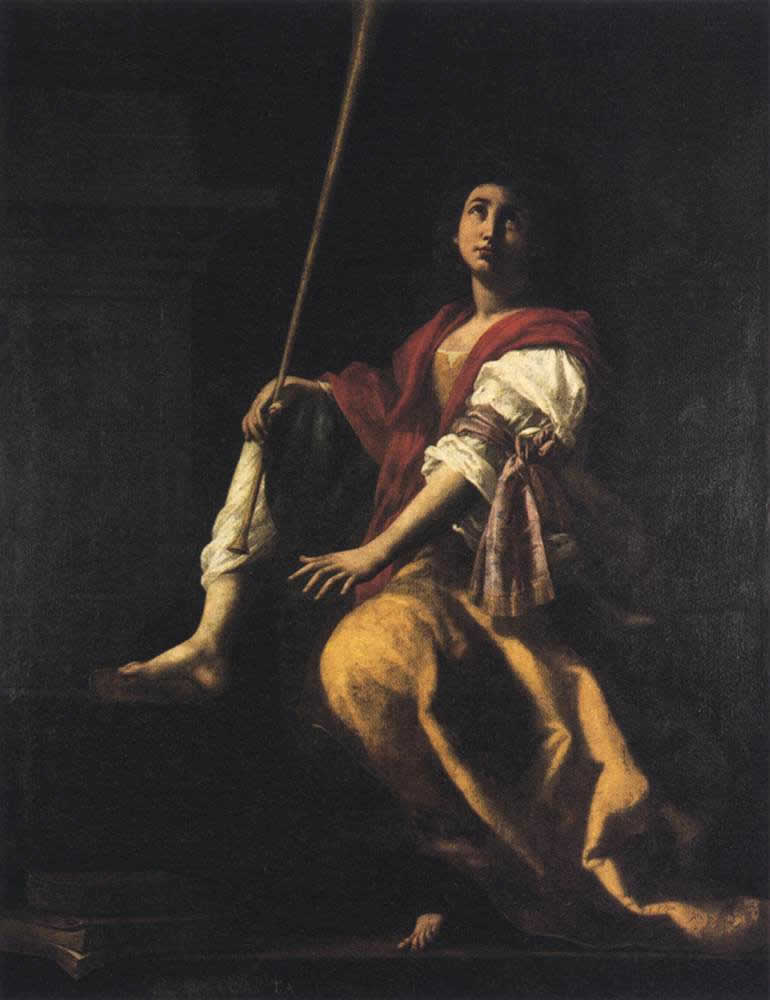
Veronese – Muse with a Lyre

- Alessandro Allori – Portrait of a Young Man (Ashmolean Museum, Oxford)
- Jacopo Bassano – The Journey of Jacob
- Titian – Mary Magdalene
- Paolo Veronese – Muse with a Lyre

== Births ==
- date unknown
  - Cornelis Danckerts de Ry, Dutch architect and sculptor (died 1634)
  - Johann Theodor de Bry, Flemish painter and engraver (died 1623)
  - Zacharias Dolendo, Dutch engraver (died 1601)
  - Antonio Mohedano, Spanish painter of the Renaissance period (died 1625)
  - Tobias Verhaecht, landscape painter and draughtsman in Italy and Antwerp (died 1631)
- probable
  - Jan Collaert II, Flemish engraver and printmaker (died 1620)
  - Toussaint Dubreuil, French painter (died 1602)
  - Léonard Gaultier, French engraver (died 1641)
  - Adam van Noort, Flemish painter and draughtsman (died 1641)
  - Marcus Gheeraerts the Younger, Artist of the Tudor court, portraitist (died 1636)

== Deaths ==
- January 9- Luca Martini, Italian arts patron (born 1507
- February - Roque Balduque, French sculptor (date of birth unknown)
- March 4 - Lancelot Blondeel, Bruges-based Flemish painter (born 1498)
- November 8 - Ippolito Costa, Italian painter (born 1506)
- date unknown
  - Alonso Berruguete, Spanish painter, sculptor and architect (born 1488)
  - Simon Bening, miniature painter of the Ghent-Bruges school (born 1483)
  - Hans Bocksberger der Ältere, Austrian painter (born 1510)
  - Paul Dax, Austrian artist (born 1503)
  - Battista Franco Veneziano, Italian Mannerist painter and printmaker in etching (born c.1510)
- probable
  - Erhard Altdorfer, German Early Renaissance printmaker, painter, and architect (born 1480)
  - Bernard Salomon, French painter, draftsman and engraver (born 1506)
