= Bernard van Orley =

Flemish artist and designer (1487/91–1541)

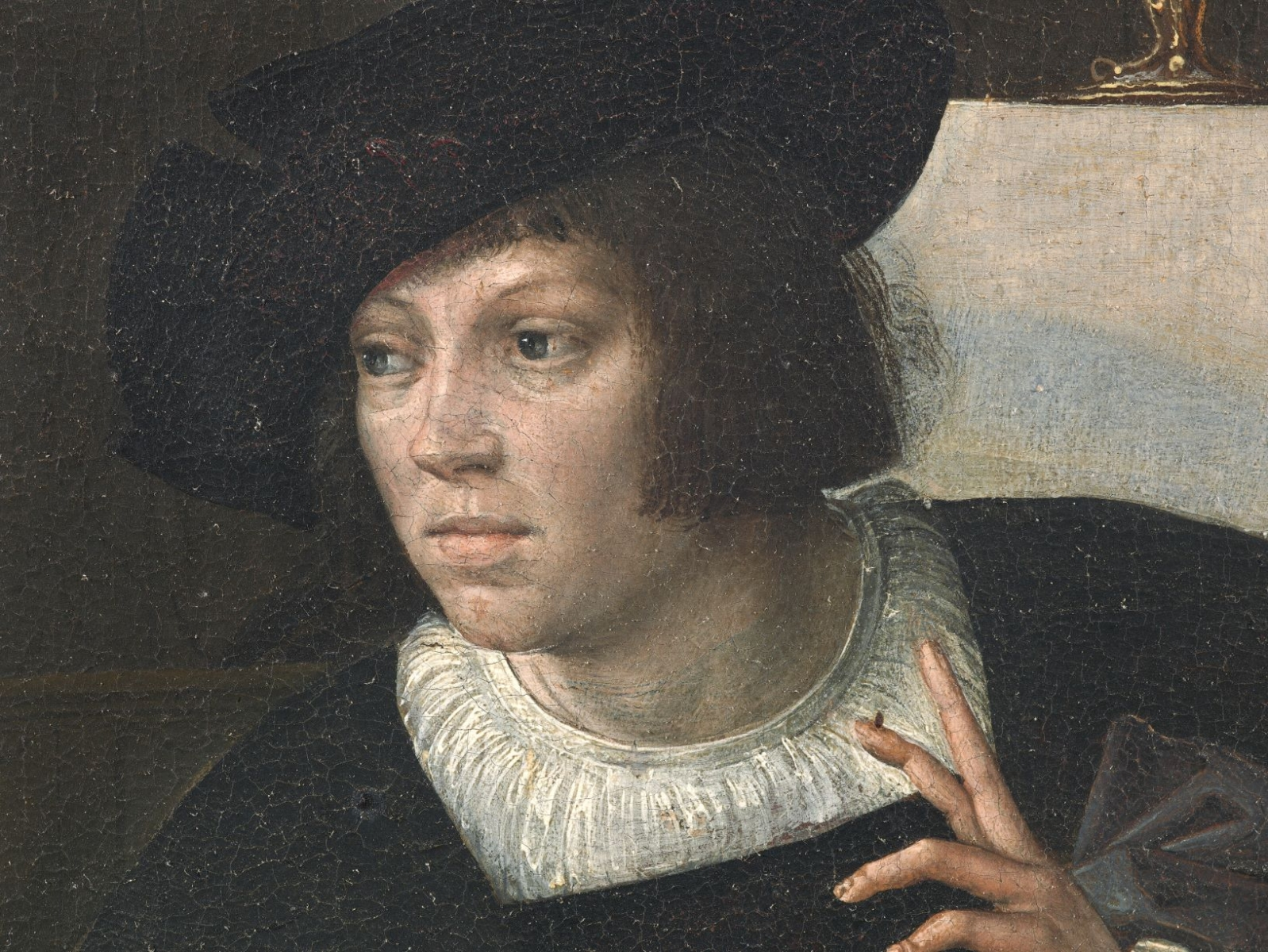
- Self-portrait from Triptych of the Virtue of Patience
- Born: Bernard van Orley between 1487 and 1491; Brussels
- Died: 6 January 1541; Brussels
- Education: Father's workshop
- Known for: Painting, tapestry cartoons, stained glass
- Notable work: Hunts of Maximilian tapestries
- Movement: Northern Renaissance
- Patrons: Margaret of Austria

Bernard van Orley (between 1487 and 1491 – 6 January 1541), also called Barend or Barent van Orley, Bernaert van Orley or Barend van Brussel, was a versatile Flemish artist and representative of Dutch and Flemish Renaissance painting, who was equally active as a designer of tapestries and, at the end of his life, stained glass. Although he never visited Italy, he belongs to the group of Italianizing Flemish painters called the Romanists, who were influenced by Italian Renaissance painting, in his case especially by Raphael.

He was born and died in Brussels and "served as a sort of commissioner of the arts for the Brussels town council". He was the court artist of the Habsburg rulers. He was productive, concentrating on the design of his works, and leaving their execution largely to others, in the case of painting, and entirely so, in the case of the tapestries and stained glass. This he may have learned from Raphael, whose workshop in Rome was unprecedentedly large.

Due to his reliance on workshop execution, his many surviving works vary considerably in quality. Many drawings, mostly studies for designs for tapestries and stained glass, also survive. He or his workshop would have produced full-scale cartoons for the tapestries, but these were normally lost in the course of weaving, when they were cut into strips. The prevalent subject matter of his paintings are religious scenes and portraits, and he painted only a limited number of mythological and allegorical subjects. His portraits mostly depict members of the Habsburg dynasty and were produced in multiple versions by his workshop. The subject matter of his tapestries was more varied, reflecting the normal range of that medium, from biblical cycles to allegories, battle and hunting scenes.

His father had been a tapestry designer in Brussels, and several of Bernard's descendants were artists. A number of them were still active in the 18th century.

== Family ==
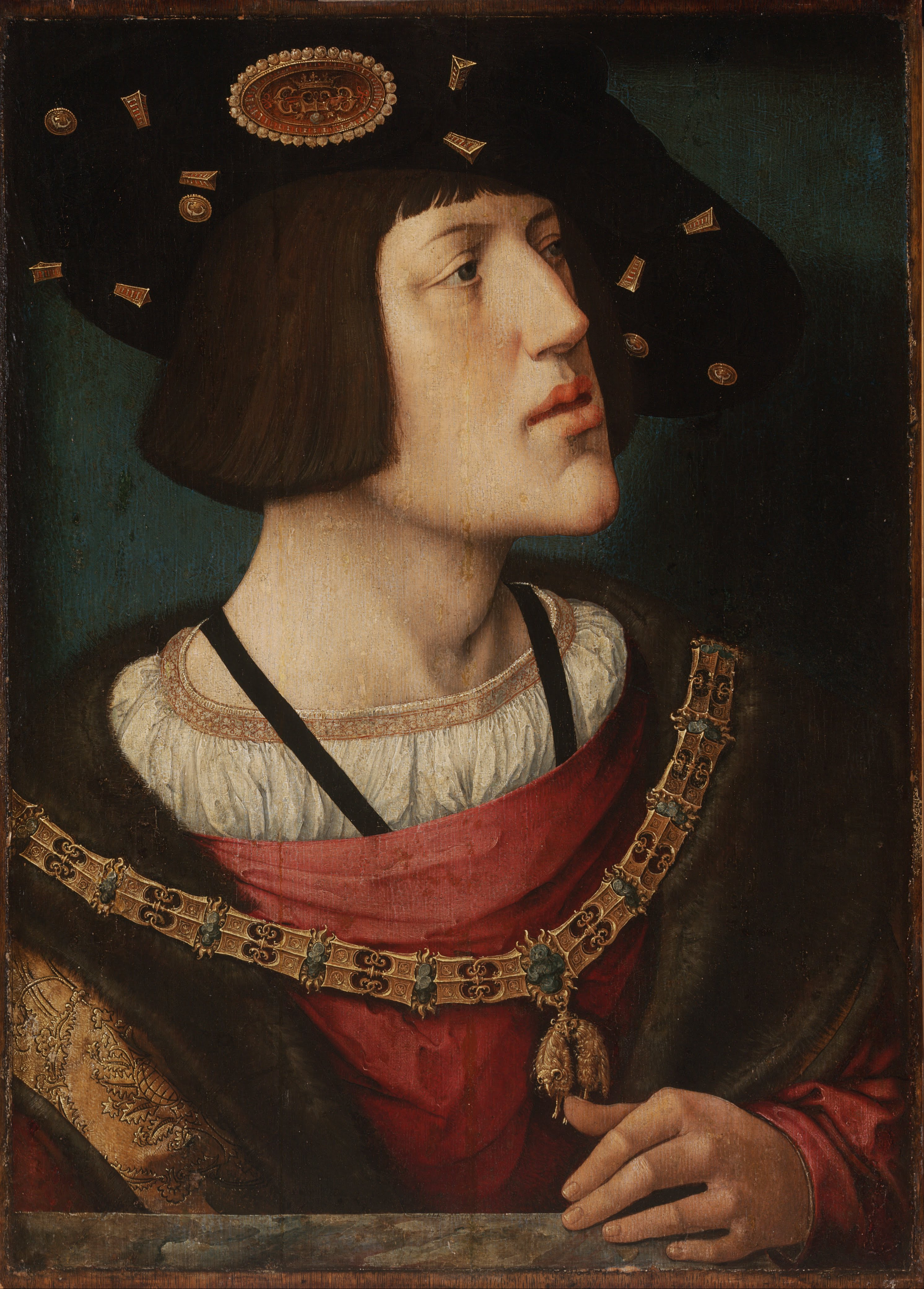
Portrait of Charles V, 1519

His family came originally from Luxembourg, descendants from the Seigneurs d'Ourle or d'Orley.His branch of the family then moved to the Duchy of Brabant, where his father Valentin van Orley (ca. 1466 – Brussels 1532) was born as an illegitimate child. Bernard and his brother Everard (who would also become a painter) were both born in Brussels.

The painted wing panels of the sculpted Saluzzo retable are attributed to Valentin van Orley, describing the Life of St. Joseph (ca. 1510). The retable itself is Gothic in style, but these wing panels already show some characteristic of the Renaissance style (City Museum of Brussels). The panels of the Life of St. Roch in the Saint James' Church, Antwerp have been ascribed to Everard van Orley.

In 1512 Bernard van Orley married Agnes Seghers; in 1539, shortly after Agnes' death, he married Catherina Hellinckx. He had nine children. His four boys followed in the footsteps of their father and also became painters.

== Apprenticeship ==
It is sometimes presumed that Bernard van Orley completed his art education in Rome in the school of Raphael, however there are no reliable sources to prove this. At that time, there were only a few painters with some renown in Brussels, such as Van Laethem and painters from the Coninxloo family. It is therefore much more likely that he was initially taught in the workshop of his father, an obscure painter whose name appears as "master" in the "Liggere" (registers) of the Guild of St. Luke of Antwerp and who had several pupils.

Bernard van Orley received his knowledge of the Renaissance style from engravings and the Raphael Cartoons for tapestries of scenes from the Acts of the Apostles that were present in Brussels between 1516 and 1520; they are now in London. They were made to be woven into tapestries for Pope Leo X by Pieter van Aelst III.

== Paintings ==
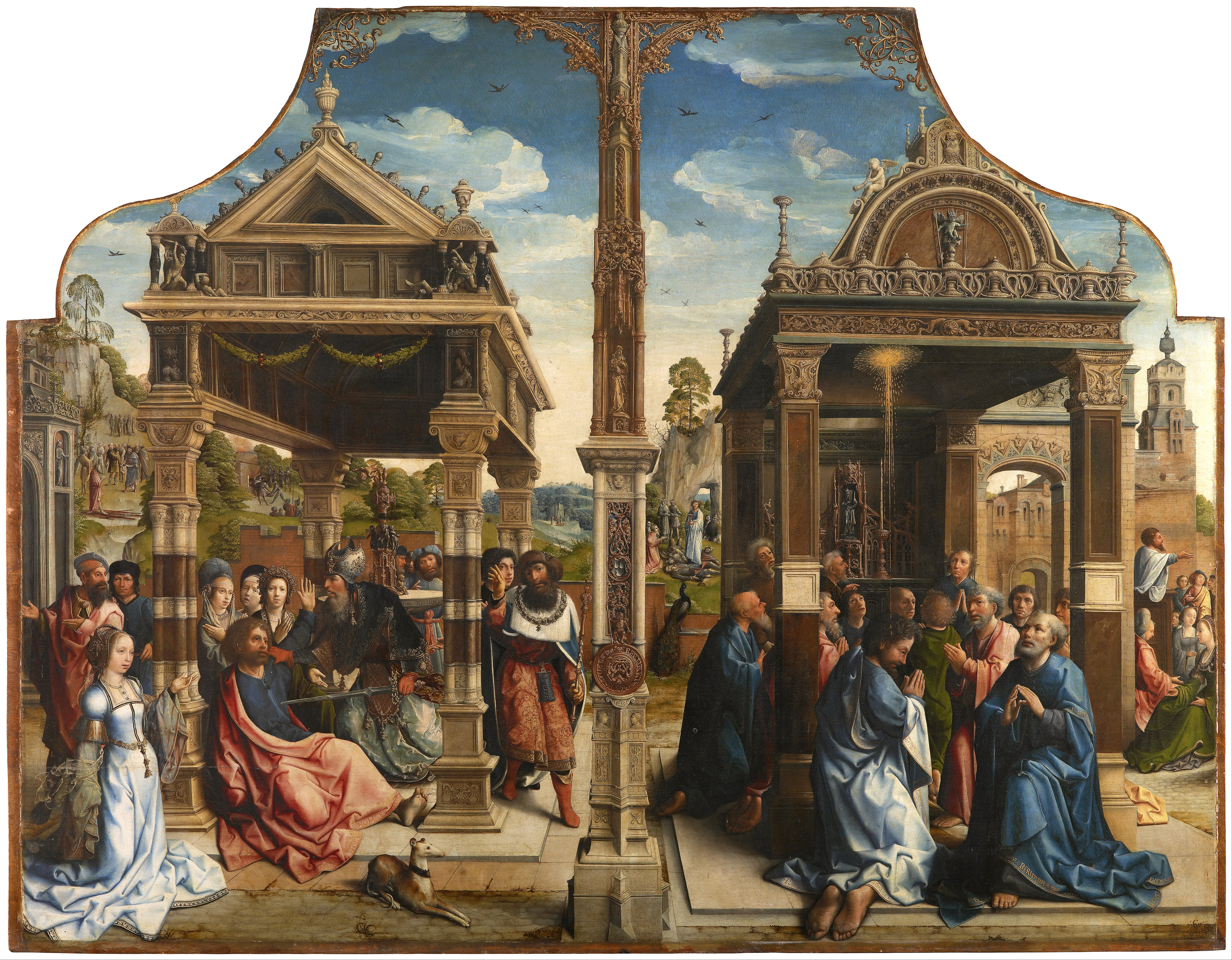
Altarpiece of Saints Thomas and Matthias

One of his earliest signed works dates from 1512: the "Triptych of the Carpenters and Masons Corporation of Brussels", also called the Apostle Altar. The central panel is in the Kunsthistorisches Museum in Vienna, and the side panels in the Royal Museums of Fine Arts of Belgium, Brussels. It recounts the lives of two apostles Thomas and Matthew. It was originally commissioned for a chapel in the Church of Our Lady of Victories at the Sablon in Brussels.

In his early works he continued the traditions of Jan van Eyck, Rogier van der Weyden and their followers, but then he gradually began integrating the Italianate motifs of the Renaissance, representing figure types and the spatial relationship such as found in the works of Raphael.

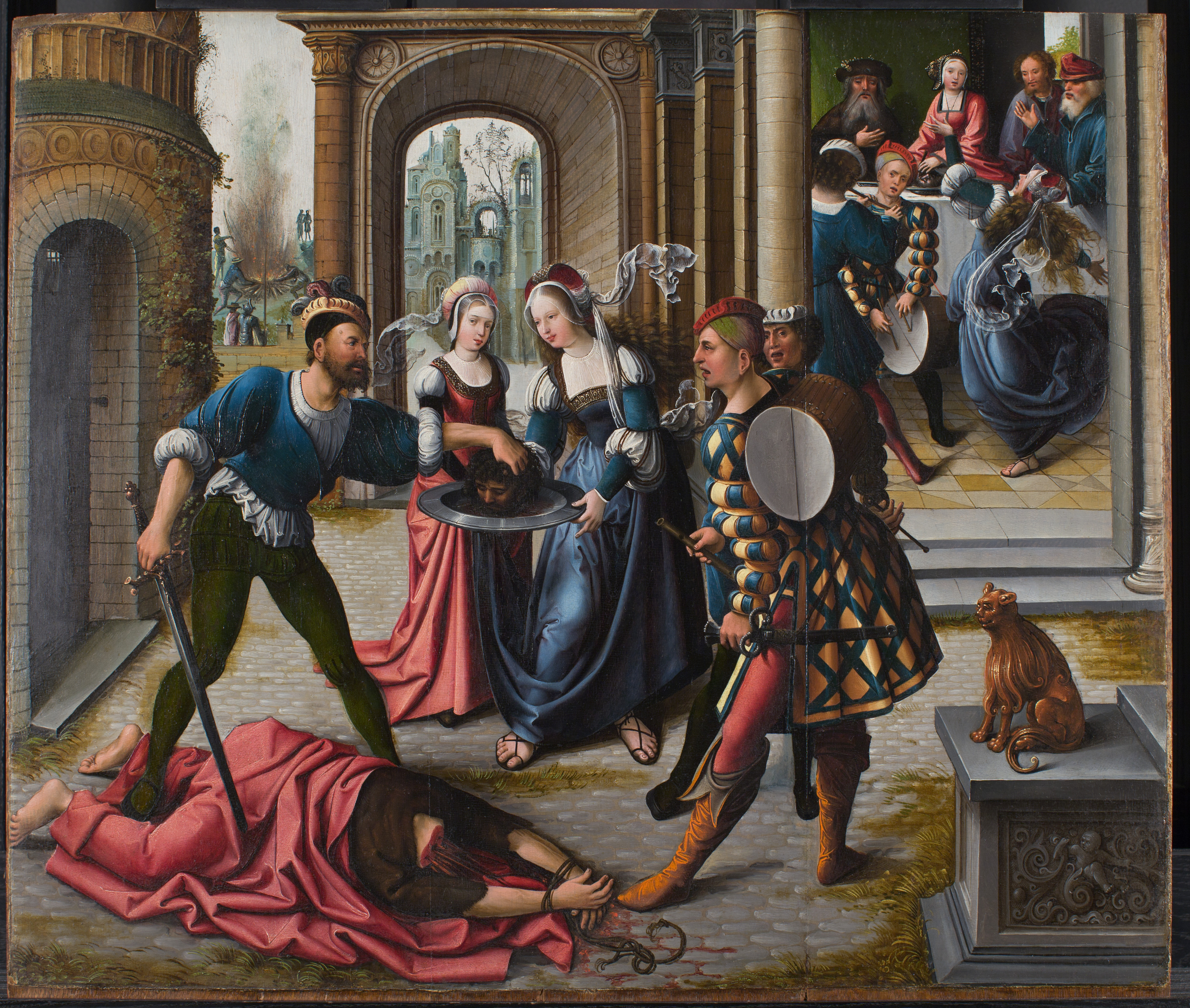
The Martyrdom of Saint John the Baptist

Around 1514–1515, he painted The Martyrdom of Saint John the Baptist, part of an altarpiece for the Benedictine abbey church of Marchiennes, likely commissioned by its abbot, Jacques Coëne. The panel painting depicts the beheading of John the Baptist, with Salome dancing at the Feast of Herod in the background. It is now on display at the Metropolitan Museum of Art in New York City.

In 1515 he was asked to take over the commission of a triptych for the Brotherhood of the Holy Cross in a chapel in the Sint-Walburga church in Veurne. He finished and delivered it in 1522. The left panel is on display in the Royal Museum of Fine Arts of Belgium. The front shows Saint Helena meeting the pope in an architectural setting of Renaissance buildings and Italianate motifs. The back is a grisaille painting of Christ falling under the Cross. The right panel is on display in the Galleria Sabauda, Turin, showing Charlemagne receiving the relics of the Passion.

From 1515 on, he and his workshop received many orders for portraits, including from the royal family and from people connected to the court. In 1516 he painted seven portraits of Charles, who had just become King of Spain, and portraits of his brother Ferdinand, the later King of Hungary, and his four sisters (destined for the King of Denmark).

The 1516 painted copy of the Shroud of Turin, commonly attributed to Albrecht Dürer, is also sometimes attributed to Bernard van Orley. By 1517 he was recognized as a master in the Antwerp Guild of St. Luke.

On 23 May 1518 he was appointed as the official court painter to the Regent of the Netherlands Margaret of Austria, replacing Jacopo de' Barbari. In this position, he became the head of an important workshop, making him one of the first entrepreneurial artists in Northern Europe. With this workshop he produced paintings and, especially after 1525, became a leading designer of tapestry cartoons and stained glass windows. He held this position until 1527 when he, his family and several other artists, fell into disgrace because of their Protestant sympathies. The family fled Brussels and settled in Antwerp. Five years later, he returned to Brussels when he was reinstated by the new Regent of the Netherlands, Maria of Austria. After his death in 1541, he was succeeded as court painter by his pupil Michael Coxcie.

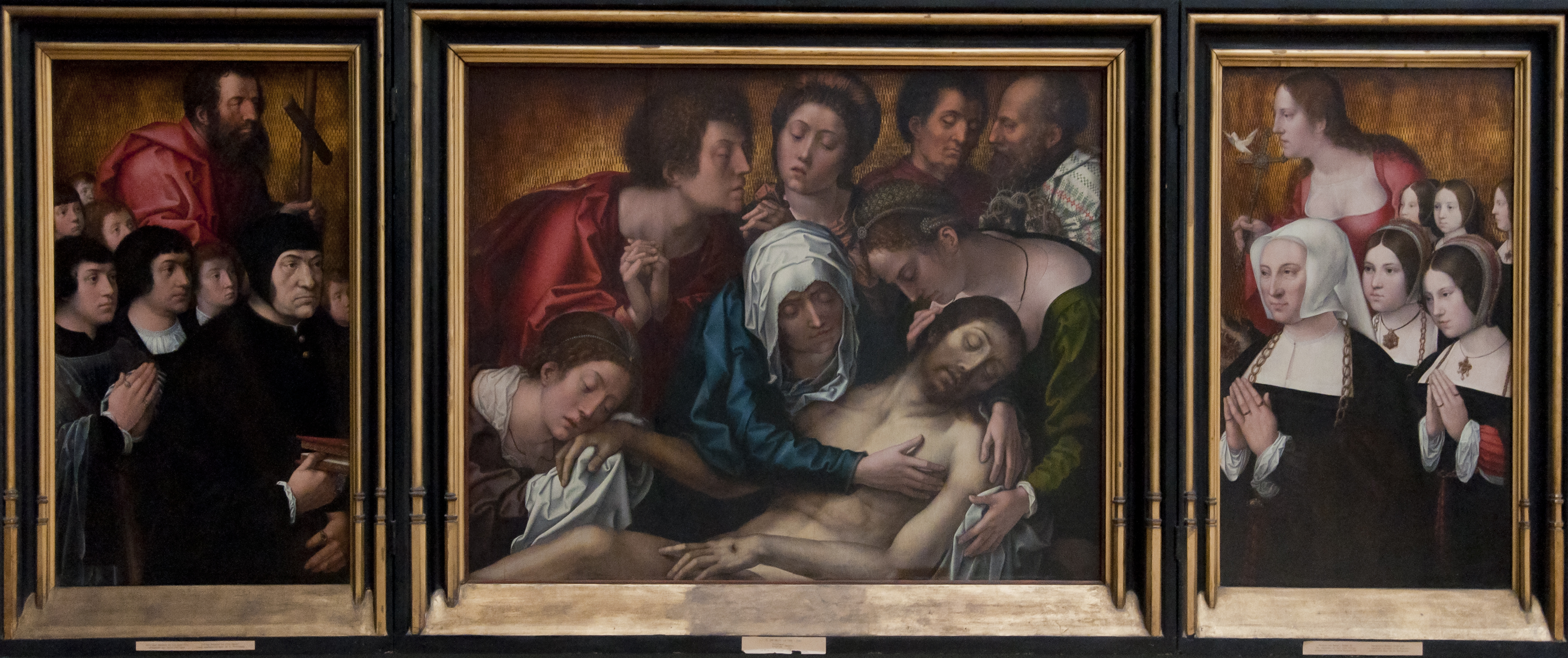
The Haneton Triptych

Among his most important paintings is the Triptych of the Virtue of Patience (Royal Museums of Fine Arts of Belgium, Brussels), also called the Job altarpiece, commissioned in 1521 by Margaret of Austria to illustrate a poem she wrote about the virtue of patience. The interior panels represent the trials of Job, while the outer panels recount the parable of Lazarus and Dives (instead of the usual grisaille paintings of saints). This triptych is completely by the hand of Bernard van Orley. He must have been especially proud of his work as he signed it twice and added his coat of arms as well as his monogram BVO and the motto 'ELX SYNE TYT' ("each his own time"). This relates to his artistic opinion that an artist should be a man fully integrated in his time.

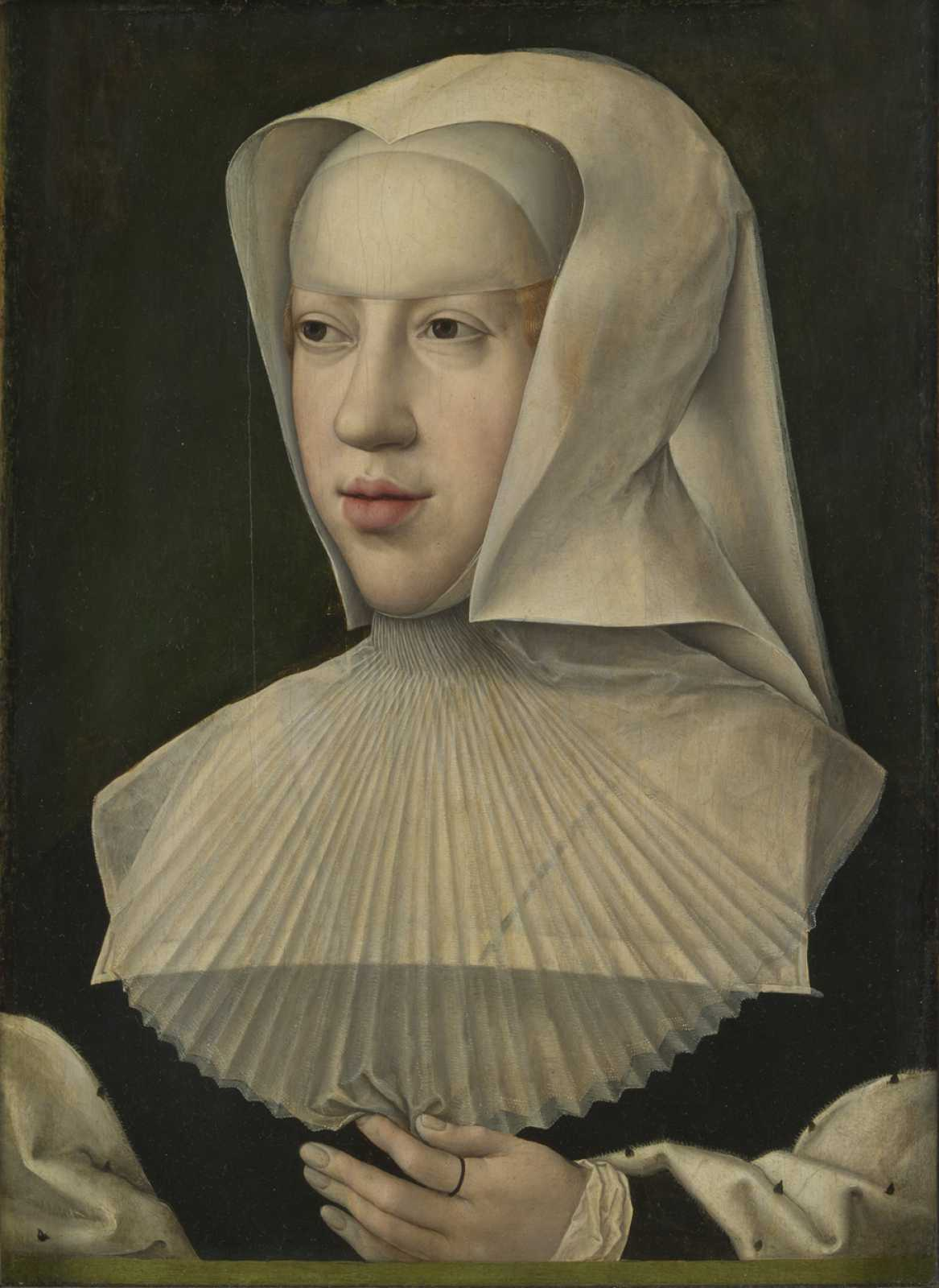
Portrait of Margaret of Austria

The same museum houses another triptych by the same painter: The Haneton Triptych. This triptych was commissioned by Philippe Haneton, first secretary in the Secret Counsel of Charles V. The middle panel depicts a poignant pietà against an archaic golden background, painted in a very personal style with influences of the Flemish Primitives and Albrecht Dürer. Bernard van Orley was, together with Jan Gossaert, among the first to introduce strong musculature in Flemish paintings. The left panel shows Philippe Haneton and his sons, and the right panel his wife and her daughters.

The triptych The Last Judgment (Koninklijk Museum voor Schone Kunsten Antwerpen), was commissioned by the almoners of the Cathedral of Our Lady, Antwerp in 1525, is one of his works in its originality and mastery. The paintings in grisaille on the back were executed by Peter de Kempeneer, who was, at that time, an apprentice in the van Orley's workshop.

The Altarpiece of Calvary in the Onze-Lieve-Vrouwekerk in Bruges, dates from 1534. It was commissioned by Margaret of Austria originally for the funeral monument in the church of Brou in Bourg-en-Bresse in Burgundy. The side panels were finished much later by Marcus Gerards the Elder and brought to Bruges by Margaret of Parma, regent of the Netherlands under king Philip II of Spain. The central part represent the Calvary, the left panel the Crown of Thorns, the Scourging of Christ and Christ carrying the Cross. The right panel depicts the Pietà and the Limbo of the Just.

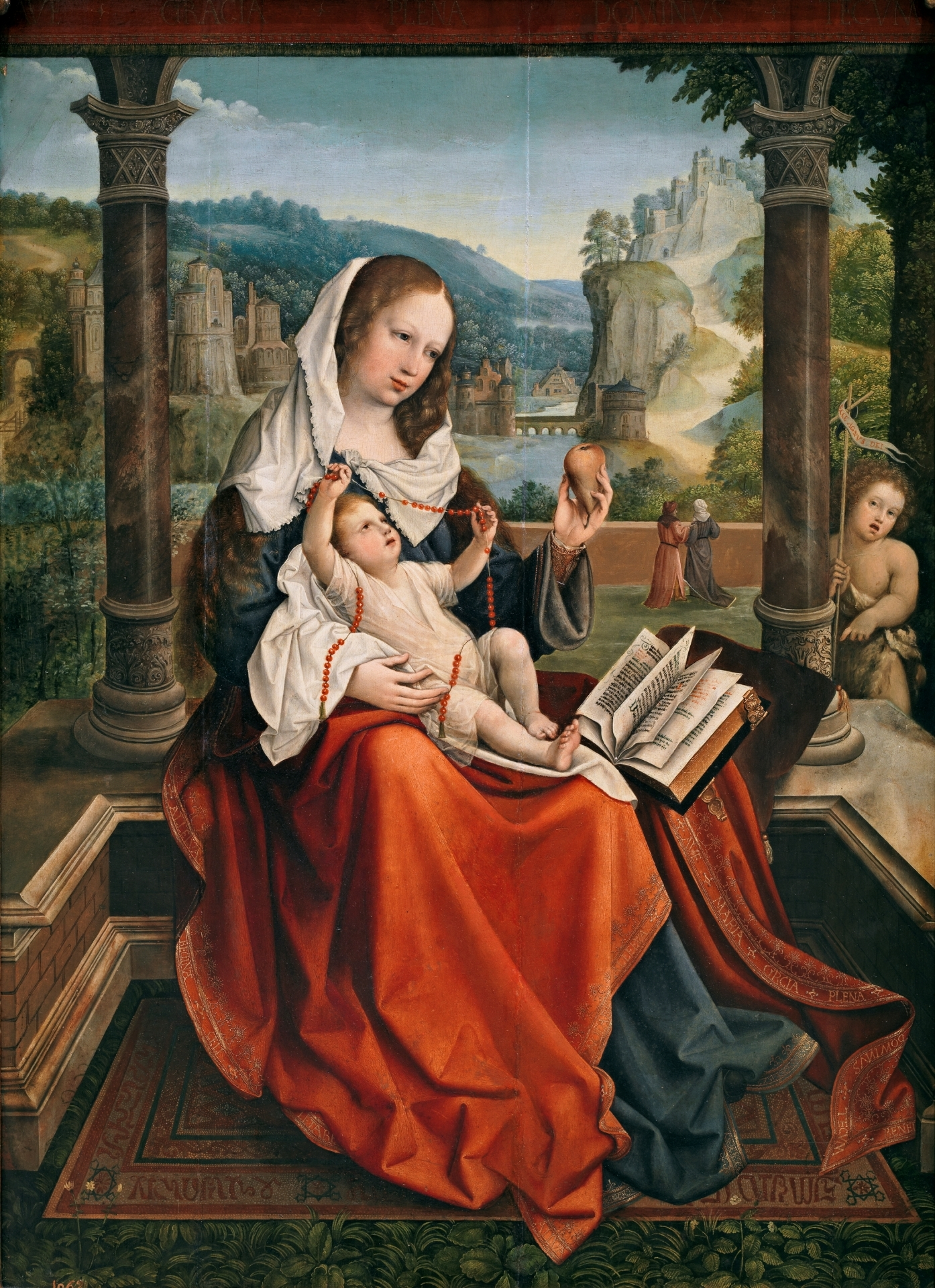
Mary with Child and John the Baptist, Prado, Madrid

His portraits were more subdued and thoughtful, such as his portraits of Charles V and Margaret of Austria. He usually represents his subjects in a seated static position, their expressionless faces without much psychological depth or feelings. His workshop produced several copies of these portraits, especially the portraits of Charles V and of Margaret of Austria. They were offered as gift to visitors or courtiers.

He usually represented saints in a full-length portrait, such as his Mary with Child and John the Baptist (Museo del Prado, Madrid), with a background of an open colonnade, a baldachin or a set of trees. This type of composition can be found in many 16th-century paintings.

Bernard van Orley often signed his paintings, especially in his early period before 1521, with the coat of arms of the Seigneurs d'Orley: argent two pallets gules. It had been contended that these are the signature of his father Valentin.

When Albrecht Dürer visited the Netherlands in 1520 to be present at the coronation of the new emperor, Charles V, he called Bernard van Orley "the Raphael of the Netherlands". Dürer, who stayed as a guest in van Orley's house between 27 August and 2 September 1520, also drew a portrait which some scholars identify as van Orley. Dürer had a profound influence on van Orley who in his later works tried to find a synthesis between Dürer and another Renaissance master, Raphael.

Some important pupils of van Orley were Michael Coxcie, Pieter Coecke van Aelst and Pieter de Kempeneer, who continued in the style of Romanism. Other pupils, such as Lancelot Blondeel and Jan Vermeyen continued in the painter-designer tradition of their master.

Together with Jan Gossaert and Quentin Matsys, Bernard van Orley is regarded as an important figure in 16th-century Flemish painting, incorporating elements of the Italian Renaissance into his work. His paintings are characterized by detailed execution and the use of vivid colors.

== Tapestries ==
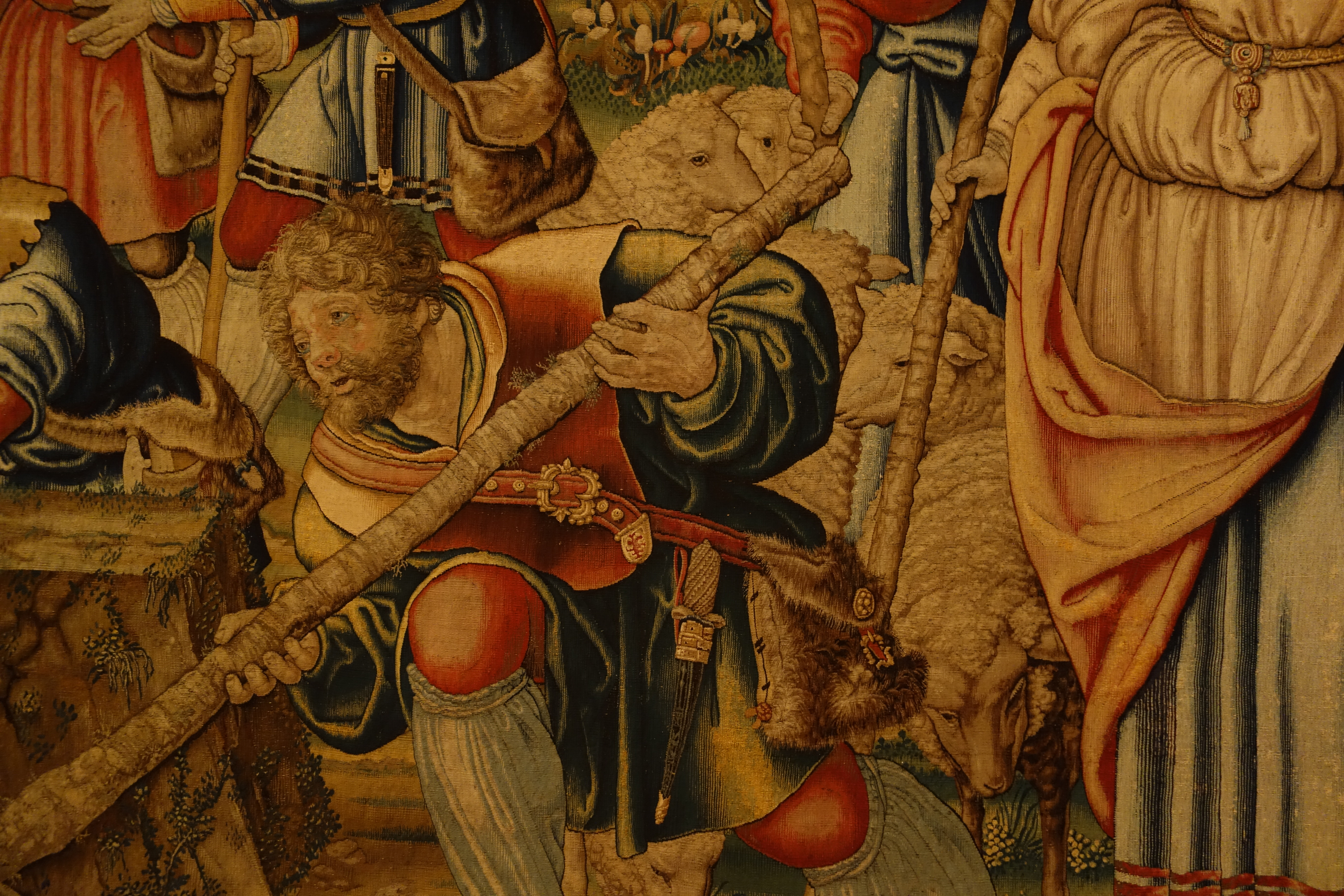
Detail of a tapestry in a set showing the life of Jacob

During this period, tapestries were held in higher esteem than paintings, and were more expensive, often woven with gold and silver thread. They had additional value as decoration and insulation for the large, bare and cold walls of palaces and church choirs.

Bernard van Orley had already started designing tapestries in his youth, but after 1530 he seemed to have stopped painting altogether, applying himself solely to cartoons for tapestries and designs for stained-glass windows.

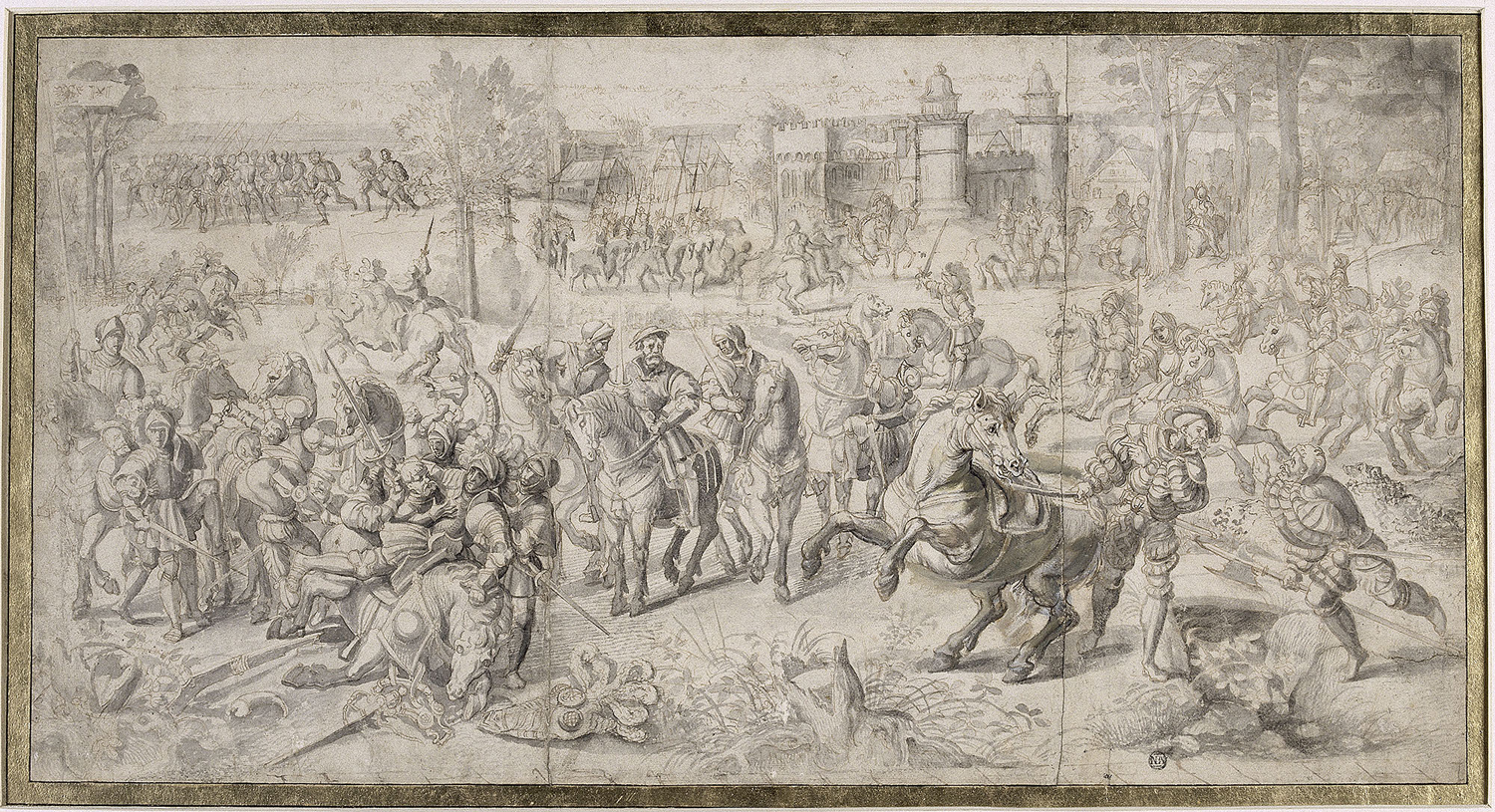
Design for one of the Tapestries of the Battle of Pavia

One of the first tapestry cartoons ascribed to him were the four cartoons for the Legend of Our-Lady-on-the-Zavel (Legend of Notre-Dame on the Sablon) (1516–1518), commissioned by Frans van Taxis. One of them represents the patron and two emperors, Maximilian I and his father Frederick III. This is an allusion to the postal contract obtained by Frans von Taxis, giving him a monopoly for the postal system between Brussels and the rest of the empire. The style of these tapestries is traditional with an overcrowded composition set in a two-dimensional plane.

From the 1520s on, under the influence of the Raphael tapestries woven at Brussels for Pope Leo X, van Orley's tapestries began to increasingly resemble paintings, more in line with the aesthetics of the Renaissance, as can be seen in his Passion series – one set in the Royal Palace of Madrid and the other set dispersed over several museums – and the Lamentation in the National Gallery of Art, Washington, D.C. These tapestries, some woven by Pieter de Pannemaeker, clearly show the influence of the tapestry cartoons of Raphael and the work of Dürer in the rendering of the figure types. Since Dürer had been a guest in the house of van Orley at the time the contracts for these tapestries were signed, it is possible that the two artists may have discussed the design. For the first time in "Passion" tapestries, the figures received dramatic weight through their large size and their position in the foreground.

Battle of Pavia Tapestries

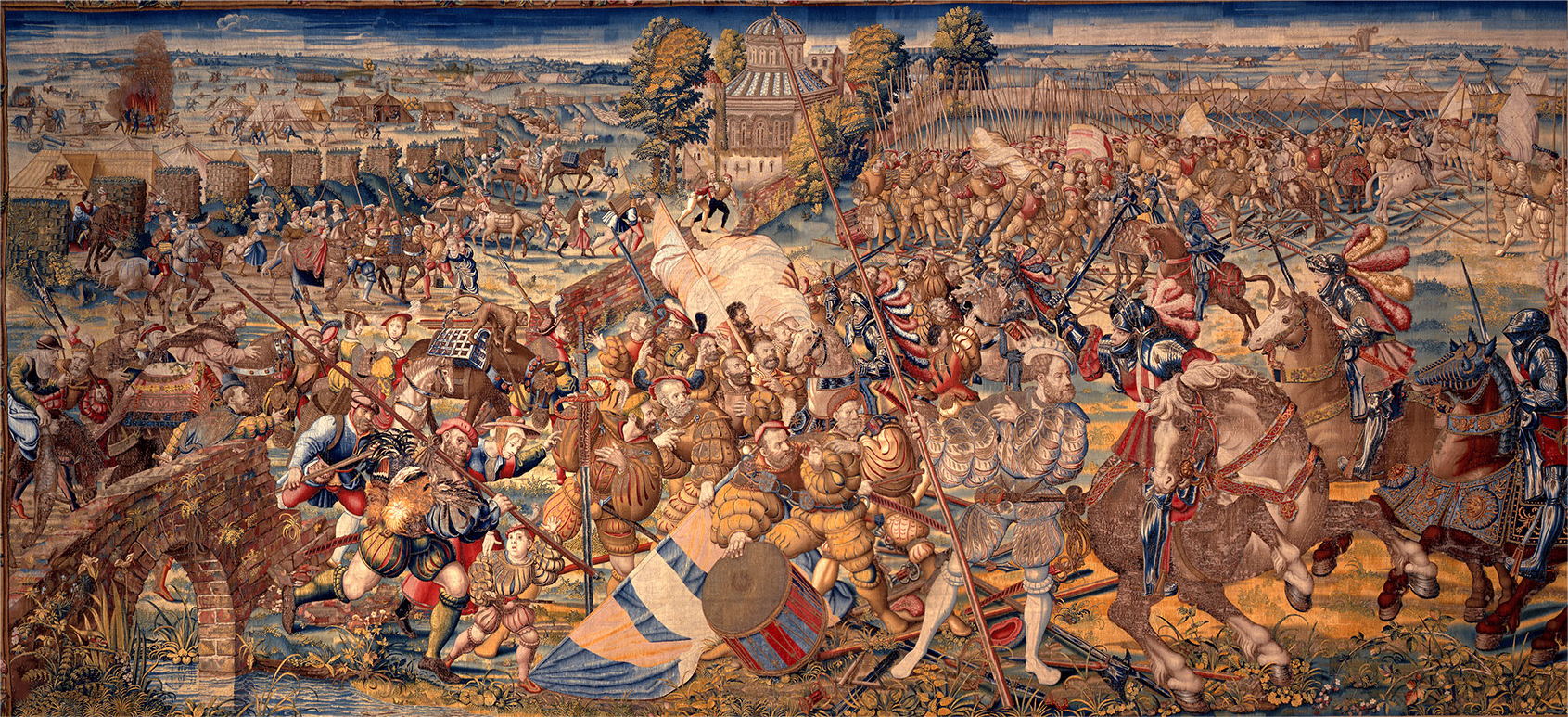
1

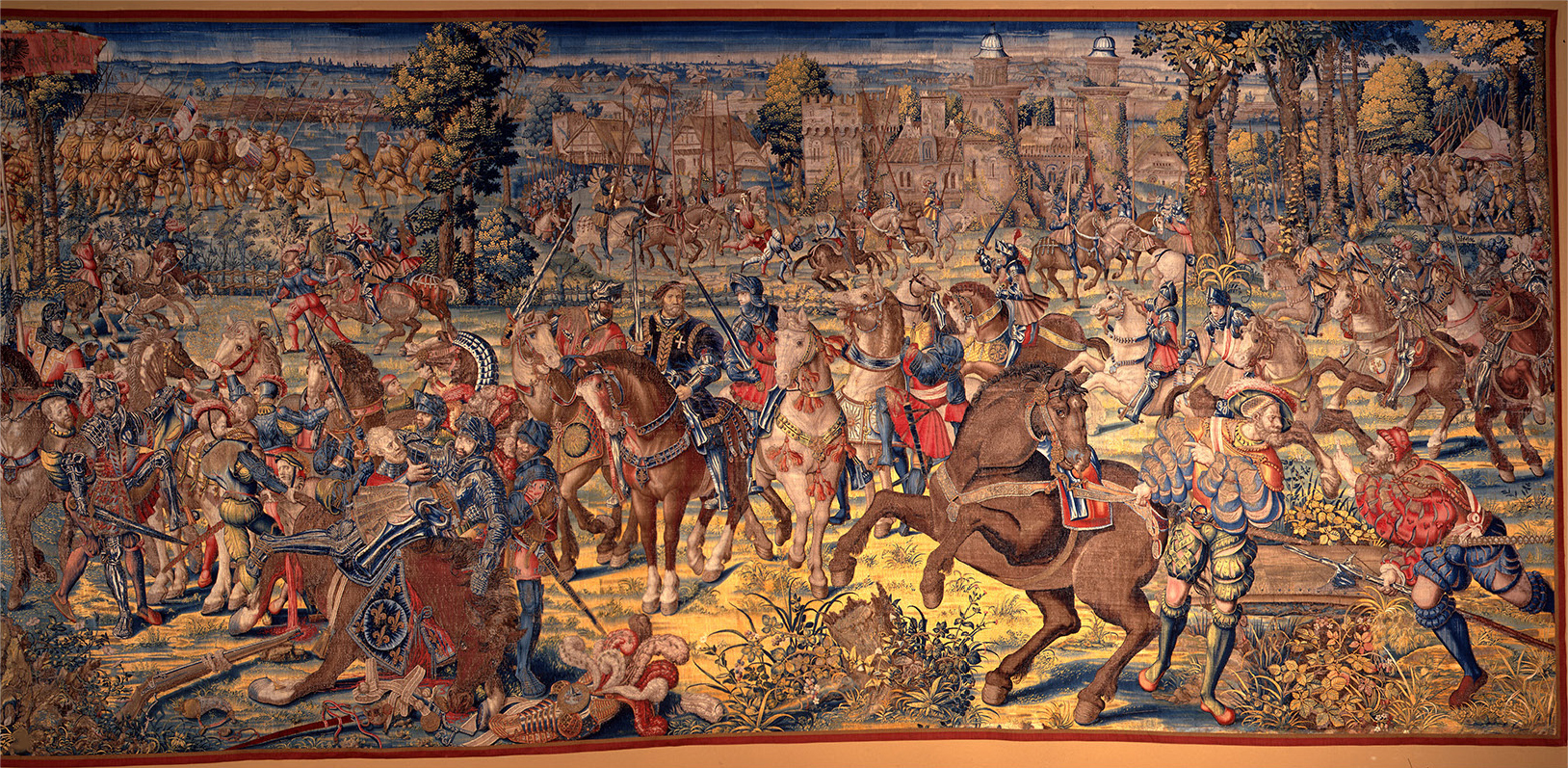
2

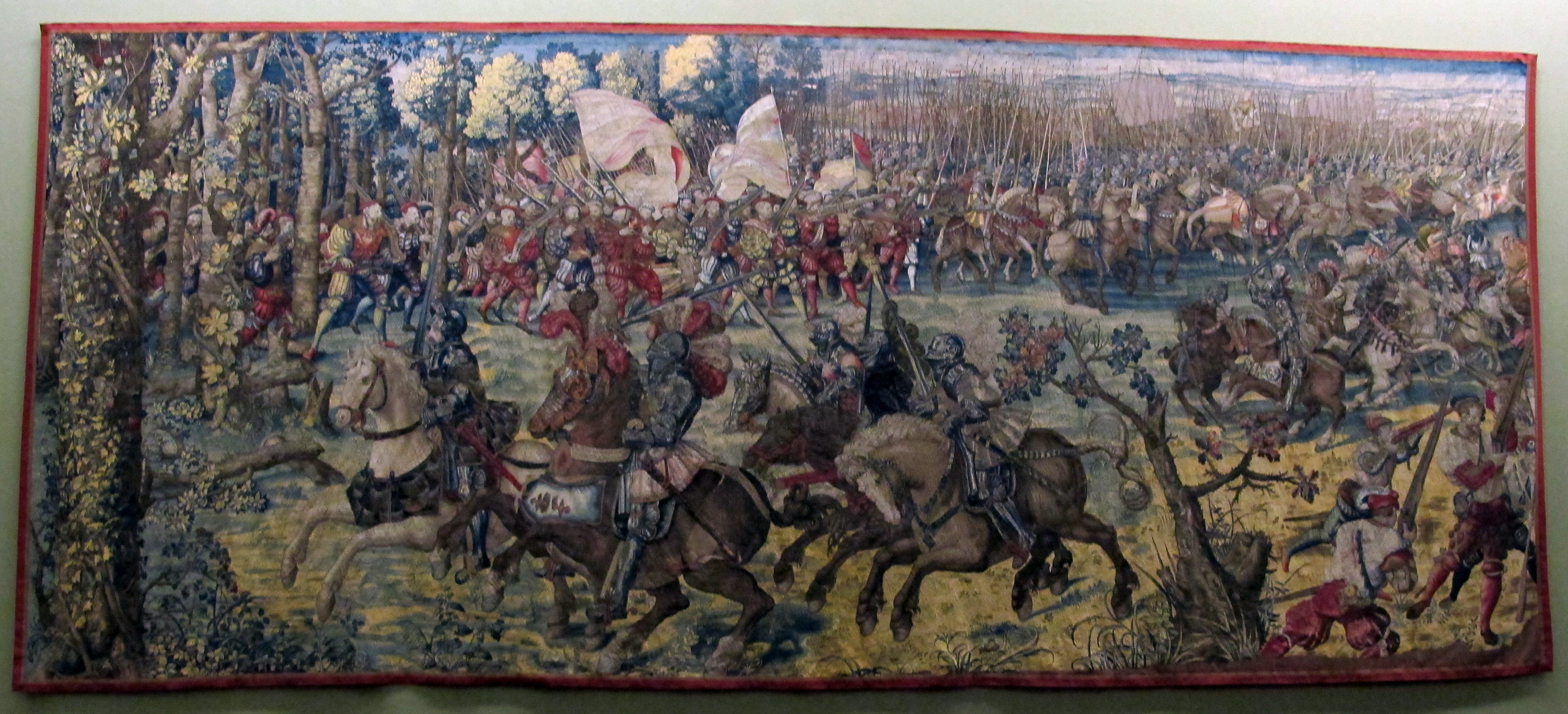
3

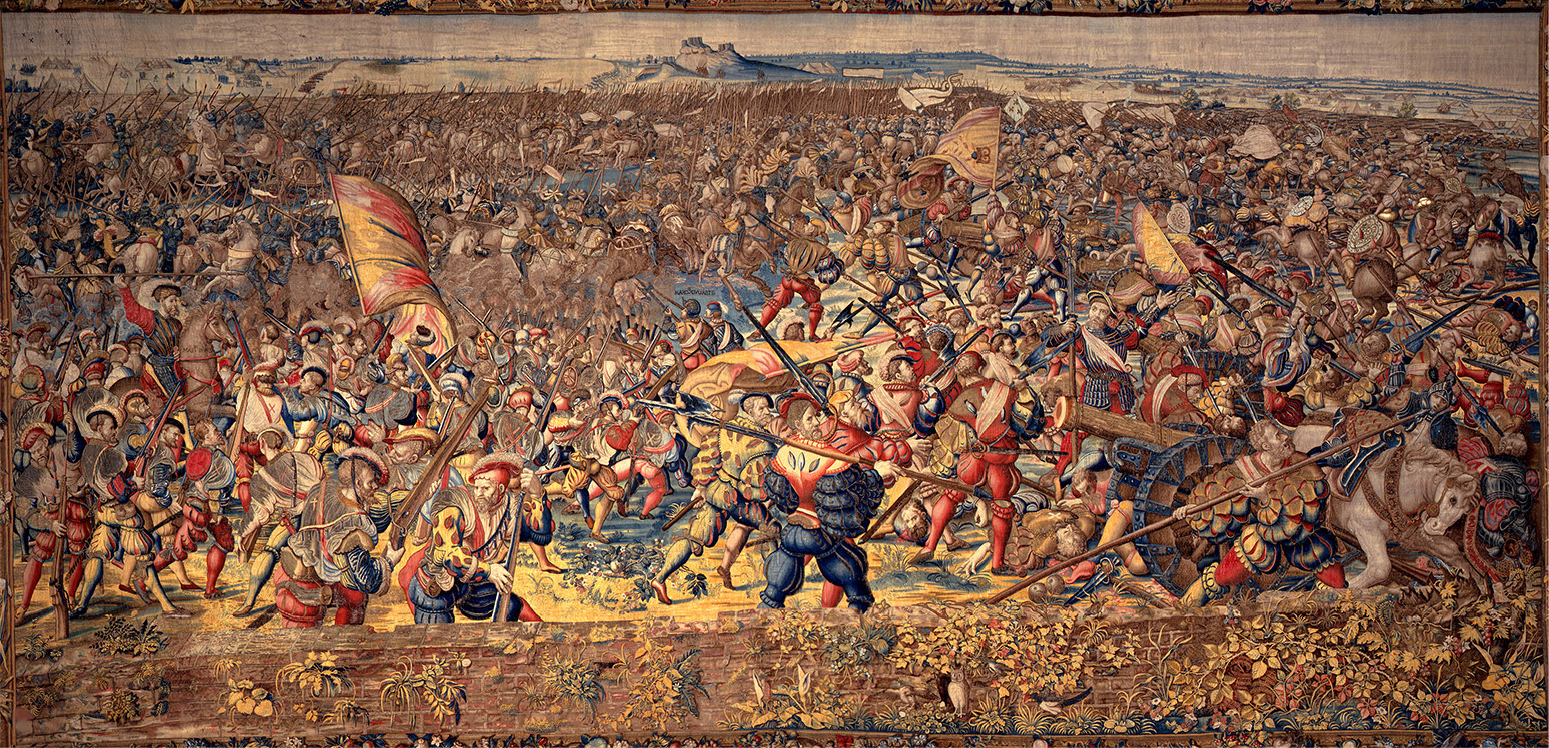
4

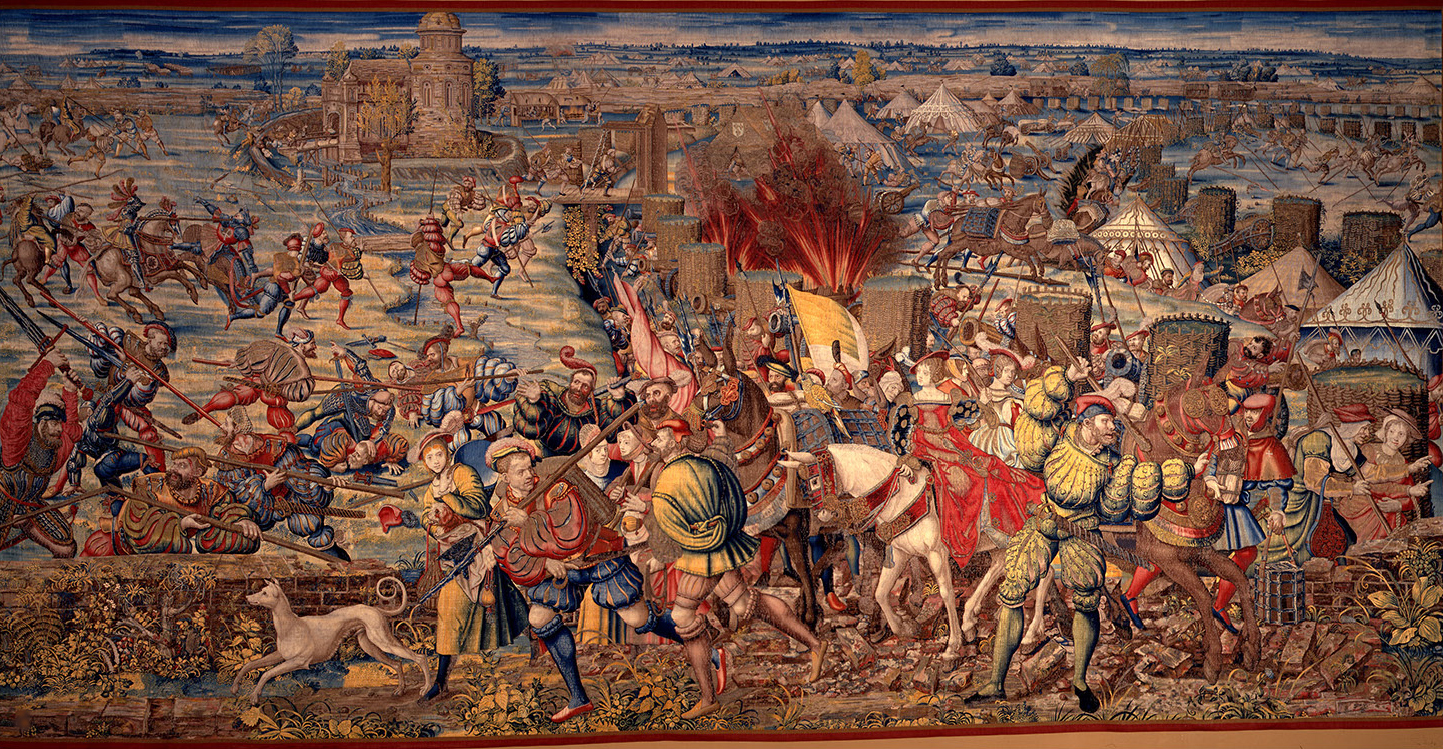
5

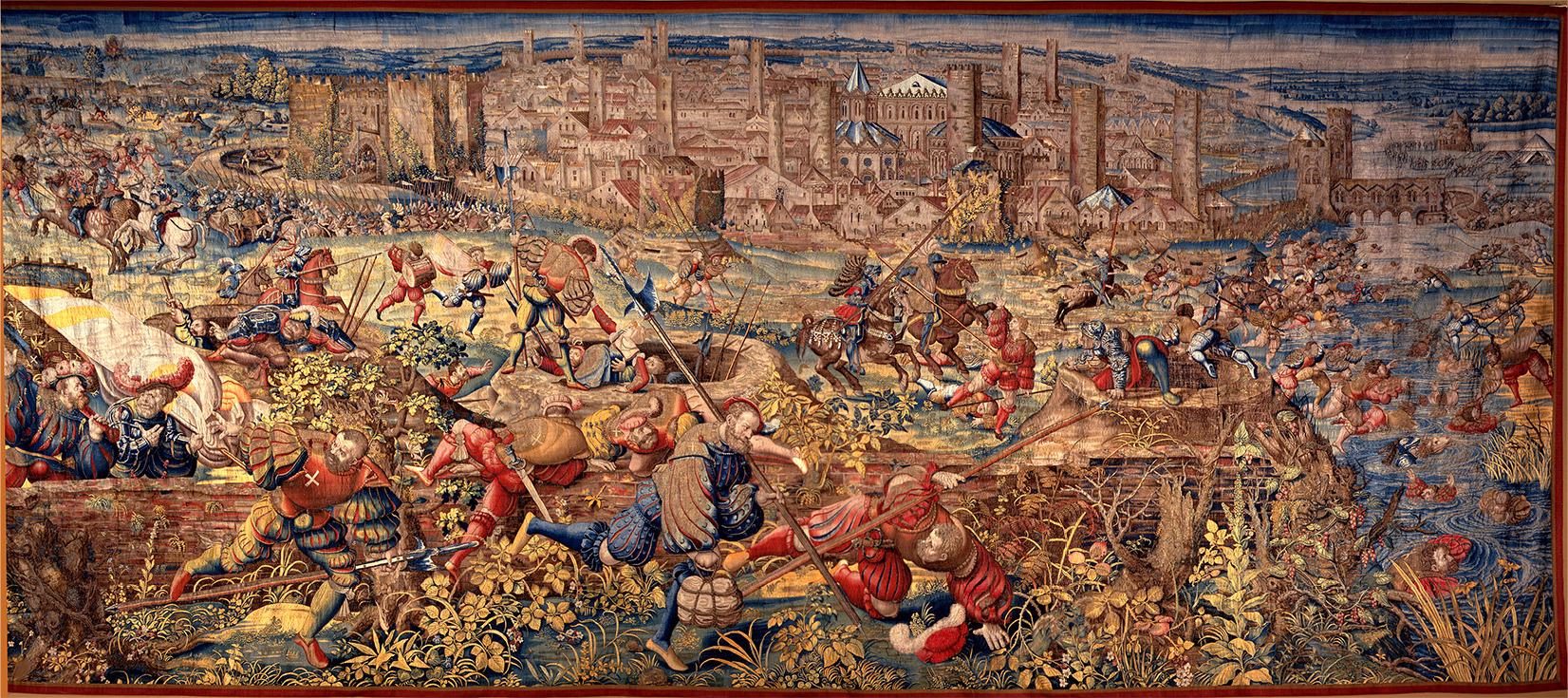
6

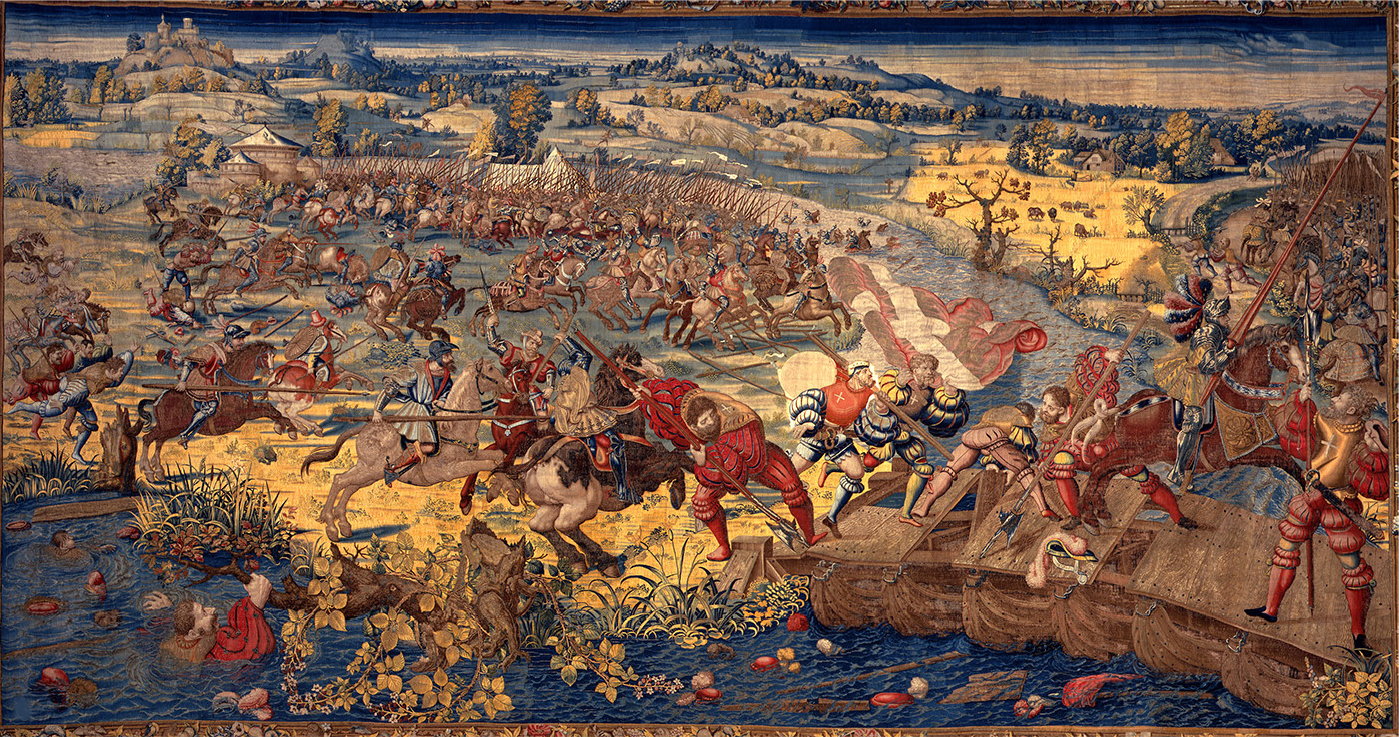
7

== Later life ==
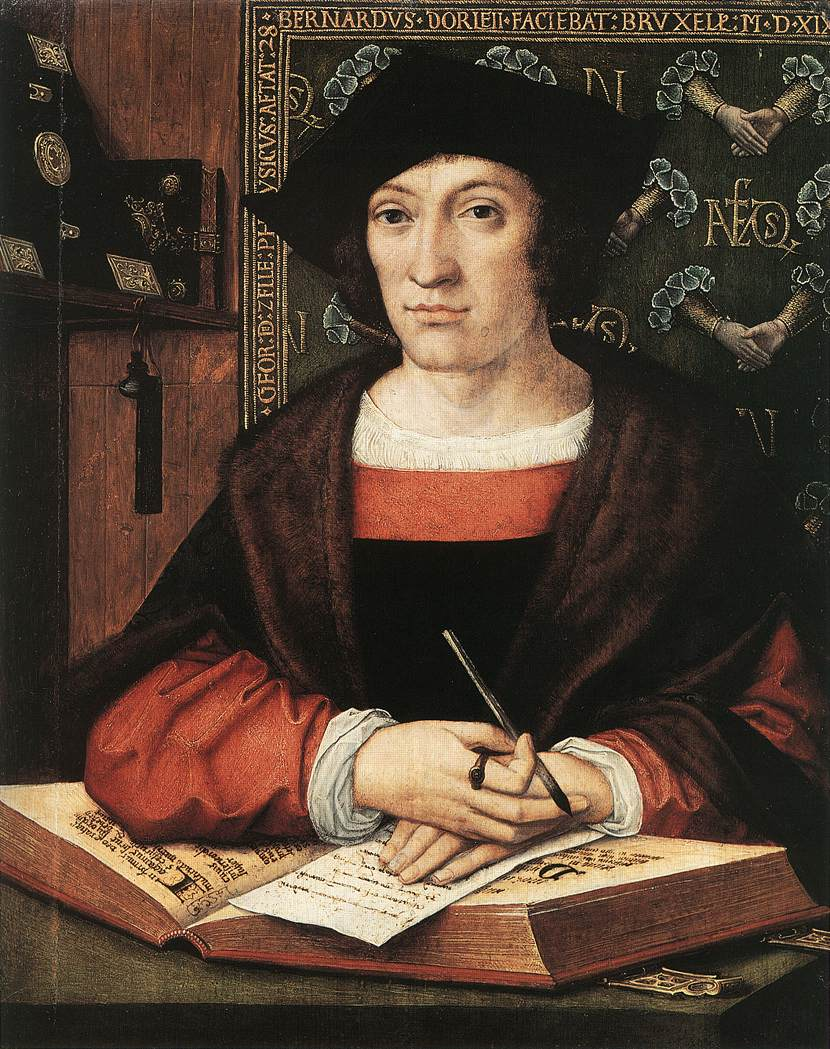
Joris van Zelle, 1519, Oil on oak panel

Van Orley became a member of the Brotherhood of St. Sebastian in the church of St. Gaugericus. More than half of the members of this brotherhood were weavers by profession.

In his later years (1521–1530) he made the twelve small cartoons (also called by their French name petits patrons), perhaps with the help of Jan Geethels, for his best-known tapestry series, The Hunts of Maximilian (Louvre, Paris). Each of the twelve tapestries represented a different month of the year. They were commissioned by emperor Charles V or someone at the imperial court. It took two years and sixty weavers to realize them. These hunts took place in the vicinity of Brussels or in the Sonian Forest. In the cartoons the rigidity of the composition makes way to a greater dynamism. He displayed his talent for depicting large-scale scenes of imaginary hunts within a realistic, picturesque, and minutely detailed landscape. For this project, van Orley sought the help of specialists in hunting and consulted the Livre de Chasse (Hunting Manual) by Gaston Phoebus. With those cartoons he, and also Johannes Stradanus, set an example for their followers by opening up new paths in Italianism with their classic breadth and ease in transforming the rendering of landscapes, successfully integrating it into Netherlandish traditional modes. This dynamism would reach its peak in the Baroque style and the work of Peter Paul Rubens. The iconography of hunting parties would be greatly imitated by the tapestry workshops of the Leyniers family – especially Everaert Leyniers (1597–1680) – the leading dyers and weavers in Brussels for over four hundred years.

Another set of tapestries were commissioned by Henry III of Nassau-Breda at about 1528–1530. They were to glorify the ancestors of the House of Nassau. The tapestries were lost in a fire in 1760, but the cartoons still exist and are in the collection of the Metropolitan Museum (New York). These tapestries were among the first to unite equestrian portraiture with more informal group portraiture.

The Battle of Pavia is another set of seven tapestries on display in the Museo di Capodimonte (Naples, Italy), while the seven small cartoons are owned by the Louvre, Paris. In these tapestries, Bernard van Orley created a detailed historical authenticity on a grand scale, with life-size figures within imagined surroundings.

The tapestry Hercules carrying the Heavenly Spheres was commissioned by king John II of Portugal in 1530 and can be seen in the Royal Palace of Madrid. The armillary was a symbol of the king of Portugal.

== Stained glass ==
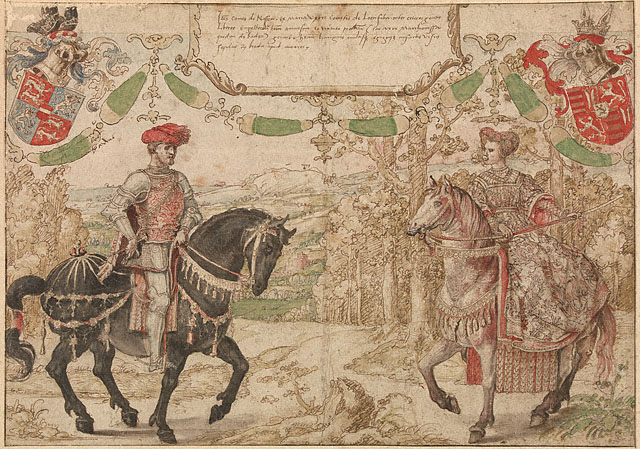
John IV, Count of Nassau-Siegen and his wife Mary of Looz-Heinsberg; both were decades dead by 1538–40, when a set of dynastic designs were made in pen with watercolour

At the end of his life he also started designing stained-glass windows. The windows in the north transept of the St. Michael and Gudula Cathedral in Brussels depict members of the House of Habsburg (Charles V and his wife Isabella of Portugal), Charlemagne and Elisabeth of Hungary, and scenes from the Legend of the Miraculous Host, while the windows in the south transept depict Louis II of Hungary and Bohemia and his wife Maria of Austria, sister of Charles V, kneeling in front of a vertical Trinity with St Louis and the Virgin with Child. These windows mark a change in style. The royal dynasty was still embedded within a religious framework, but the donor was now emphasized and not the venerated saint. It was also no longer deemed necessary to legitimize the position of the sovereign by a genealogical tree, as Philip the Handsome, the father of Charles V, was not represented. These windows can be ascribed with certainty to drawings by Bernard van Orley. They were executed by the master glass-worker Jean Haeck.

He also designed the stained-glass windows for the St Rumbolds Cathedral, Malines depicting Margaret of Austria, her third husband Philibert II, Duke of Savoy, and Christ entering Jerusalem. These windows were destroyed during the religious conflicts between 1566 and 1585. In 2004 an unpublished colored drawing of these windows was discovered in Valenciennes

The Sint-Bavokerk in Haarlem, Holland, also has a set of stained-glass windows designed by van Orley, depicting the donor Joris van Egmont, bishop of Utrecht and his patron saint Martin.

== Other artists in the family van Orley ==
Bernard van Orley belonged to a large family of painters, starting with his father:

1. Valentin van Orley (1466–1532): Philipp van Orley (ca. 1491–1566) (designer of tapestry cartoons); Bernard van Orley (1492?–1542?), painter and tapestry designer; Everard van Orley (born after 1491), painter; Gomar van Orley, painter (active around 1533).
2. Bernard van Orley: Michael van Orley; Hieronymus van Orley I, painter (active around 1567–1602); Giles van Orley, painter (ca. 1535–1553)
3. Giles van Orley (ca. 1535–1553): Hieronymus van Orley II (painter and decorator)
4. Hieronymus van Orley II: Hieronymus van Orley III, portrait painter, decorator, etcher (documented in 1652); Pieter van Orley (1638–after 1708), miniaturist and landscape painter; François van Orley, history painter; Richard van Orley I
5. Pieter van Orley (1638–1708): Richard van Orley II (1663–1732), painter and etcher; Jan van Orley (1665–1735), painter and etcher.
