= 1586 in art =

Events from the year 1586 in art.

== Events ==
- Flemish refugee Adam van Noort is commissioned by the County of the City of Coventry to produce a painting of local heroine Lady Godiva.

== Works ==
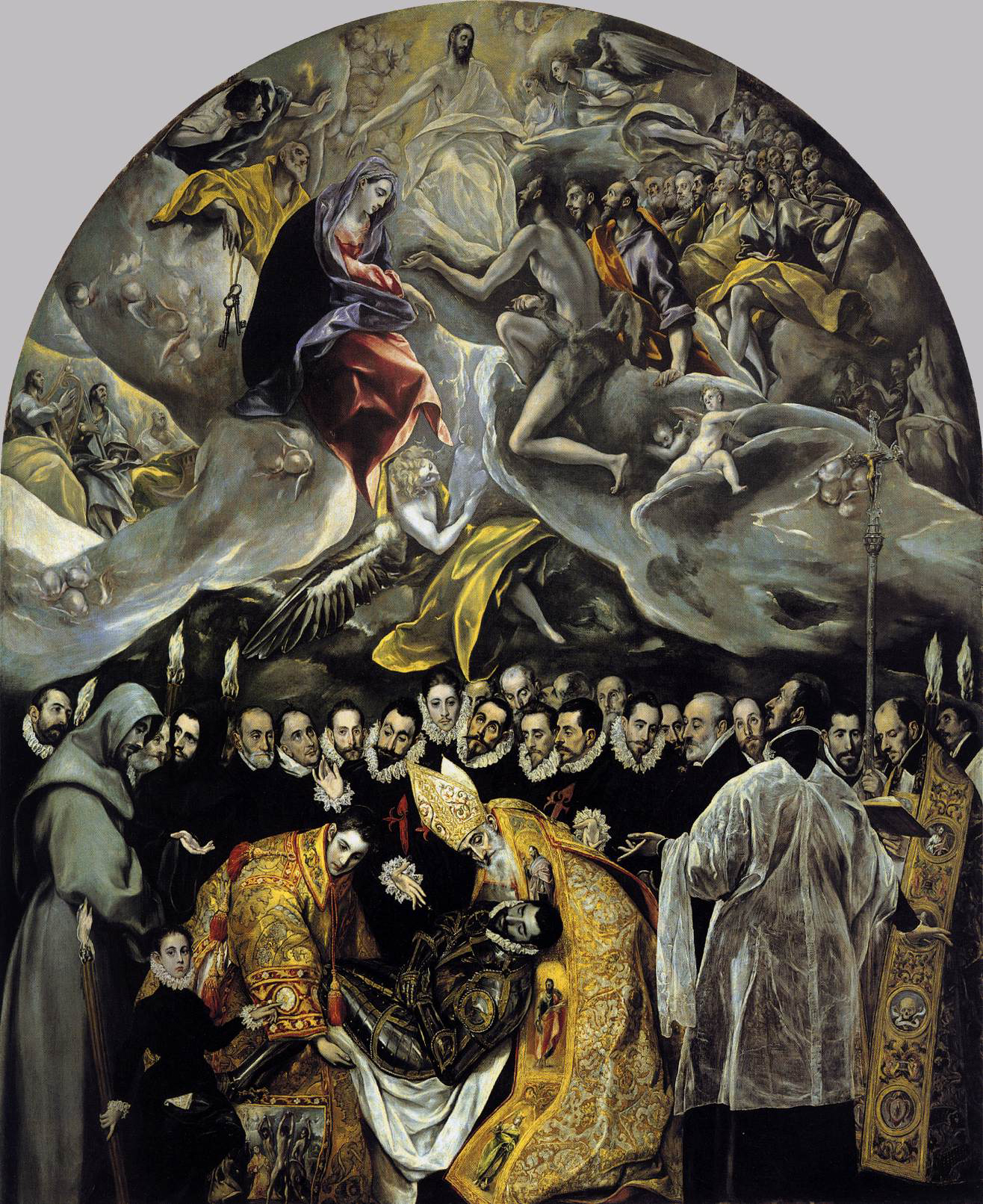
El Greco – The Burial of the Count of Orgaz

- Anonymous – Portrait of Sir Henry Unton
- Giuseppe Arcimboldo – An Allegory of Death
- Federico Barocci – Vocation of Saints Peter and Andrew (Royal Museums of Fine Arts of Belgium)
- Hieronimo Custodis – Edward Talbot
- El Greco – The Burial of the Count of Orgaz

== Births ==
- date unknown
  - Giovanni Stefano Marucelli, Italian painter and architect active mainly in Tuscany (died 1646)
  - Orazio Riminaldi, Italian Caravaggisti painter of the Baroque period (died 1631)
  - Tiberio Tinelli, Italian painter of portraits of aristocracy, merchants, and intellectuals in Venice (died 1638)
  - Luis Tristán, Spanish painter (died 1624)
- probable
  - Massimo Stanzione, Italian Caravaggisti Baroque painter of frescoes (died 1656)
  - Nicholas Stone, English sculptor and architect (died 1647)

== Deaths ==
- January 25 - Lucas Cranach the Younger, German painter and wood-engraver (born 1515)
- May 9 - Luis de Morales, Spanish painter (born c. 1509)
- date unknown
  - Francesco Camilliani, Italian sculptor (born 1530)
  - Pedro Campaña, Flemish painter (born 1503)
  - Giovanni Battista Maganza, Italian religious painter (born c.1513)
  - Matthias Zündt, German engraver (born 1496)
