= Madonna and Child with the Book =

Painting by Raphael

Madonna and Child
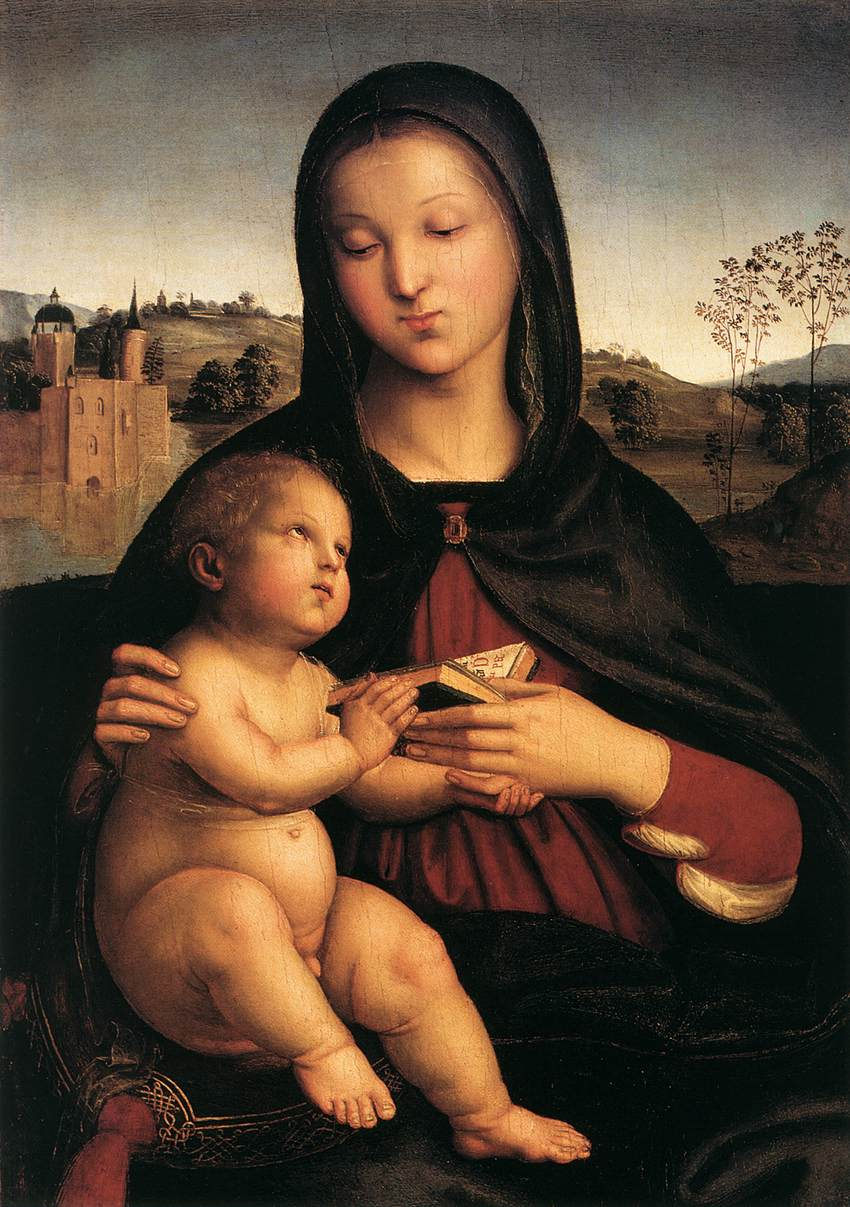
- Artist: Raphael
- Year: c. 1503
- Medium: Oil on wood
- Dimensions: 55 cm × 45 cm (22 in × 18 in)
- Location: Norton Simon Museum, Pasadena

The Madonna and Child is an oil on wood painting by the Italian High Renaissance painter Raphael, executed c. 1503. It is housed in the Norton Simon Museum in Pasadena, California.

== See also ==
- List of paintings by Raphael
