= Mystic Marriage of Saint Catherine (Filippino Lippi) =

1501 painting by Filippino Lippi

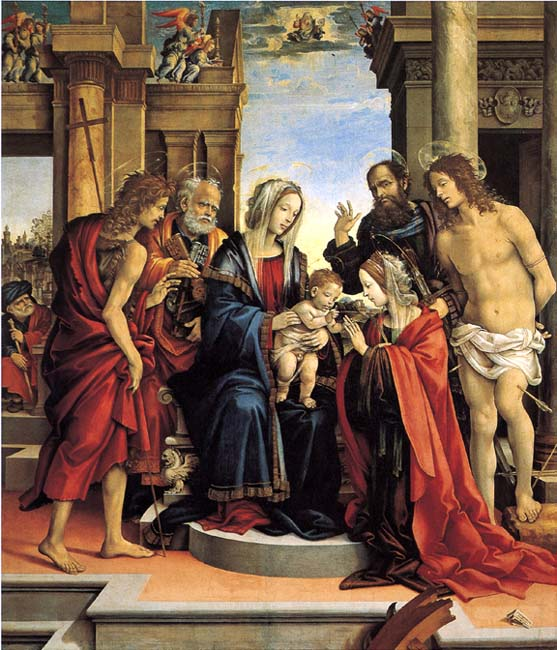
- Artist: Filippino Lippi
- Year: 1501
- Medium: Oil on panel
- Dimensions: 202 cm × 172 cm (80 in × 68 in)
- Location: Basilica of San Domenico, Bologna

The Mystic Marriage of Saint Catherine is an oil painting on panel by the Italian Renaissance painter Filippino Lippi, dated 1501. It is housed in the Isolani Chapel of San Domenico, a church of the Dominican Order in Bologna.

The painting pivots around the scene of the mystical marriage of Saint Catherine of Alexandria, while around her a sacra conversazione is held, the participants in which are, on the right, Saint Paul and Saint Sebastian, and, on the left, Saint Peter and Saint John the Baptist. The setting of the scene is rather conventional, although Lippi's usual taste for bizarre decorations can be seen in details such as the harpy sculpted on a corner of Virgin's throne or the fragment of the wheel on which Saint Catherine would have been tortured. Also, the architecture in the background is rather classical.
