= Hans Bocksberger der Ältere =

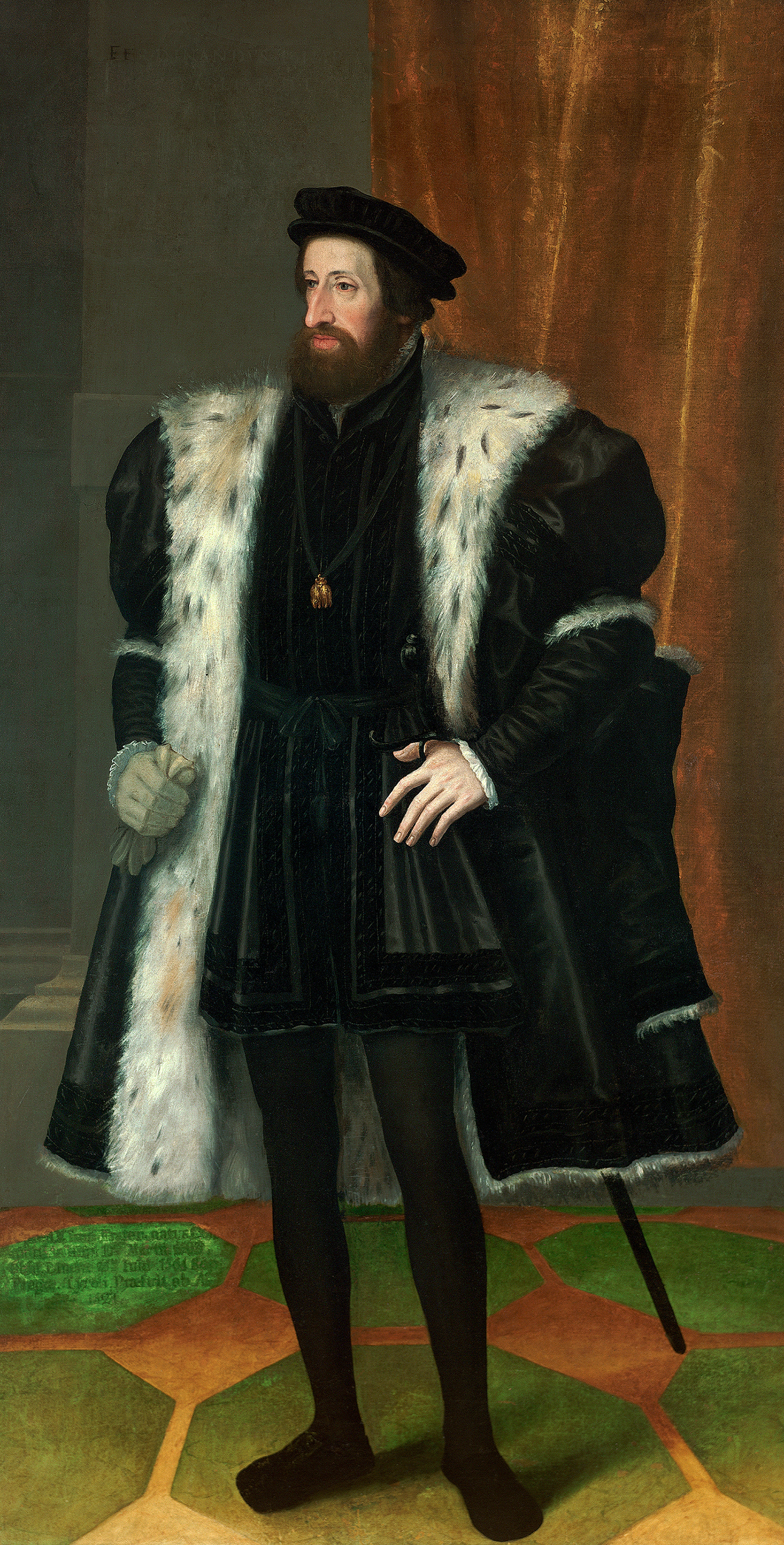
Hans Bocksberger der Ältere, Ferdinand I, Holy Roman Emperor, Kunsthistorisches Museum

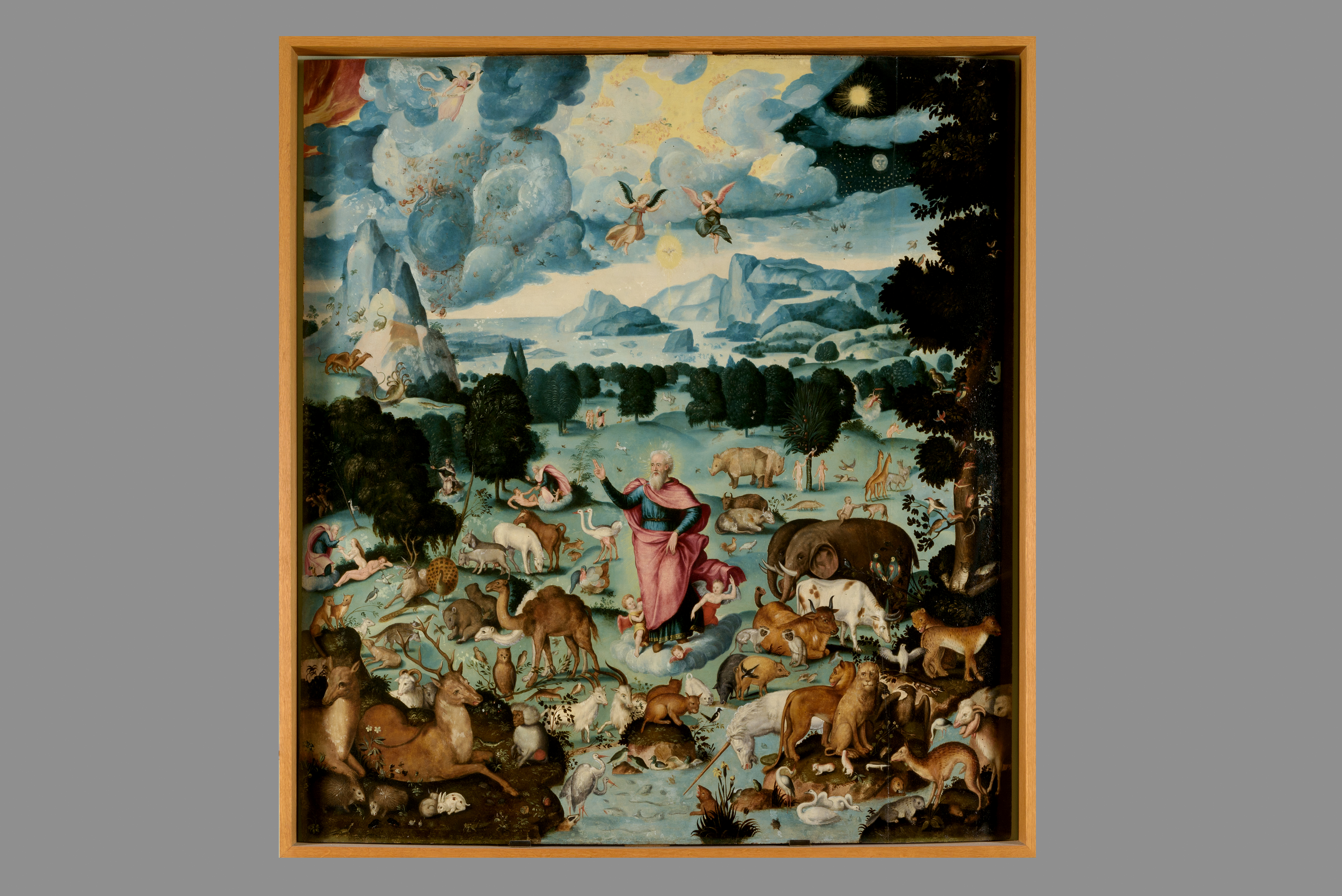
Paradise on Earth

Hans Bocksberger der Ältere (1510–1561), also known as Hans Bocksberger the Elder, was an Austrian painter and woodcutter of the high Renaissance.

== Life ==
Hans Bocksberger was born in Mondsee, the son of Ulrich and Anna Bocksberger. The work of his father Ulrich Bocksberger is largely unknown. Hans may have initially studied with his father, then later traveled to Italy where he picked up styles he would later incorporate into his own work. Hans married his wife Margaret in 1542. They had nine children together: sons Hans Bocksberger the Younger and D. J. Heinrich were both painters, in addition to Anna, George, Sabine, Catharina, Elisabeth, Margarethe, Lucia. Hans died in Salzburg in 1561. His wife Margaret died in 1579.

== Works ==
- frescoes in the Protestant Ducal Palace in Neuburg an der Donau
- frescoes in the Church of St. Jodok, Landshut

Works attributed to Hans Bocksberger, but where there are some questions to authorship:

- frescoes in the Castello del Buonconsiglio in Trento
- paintings in the Knight's Hall in the castle in Goldegg
- works in the Hradčany castle
- altarpieces in the St. Vitus Cathedral
- frescoes in the castle Freisaal
- grotesques in Hohensalzburg Castle

== Literature ==
- Hans Bocksberger in the Karlsruhe virtual library
- Kaeppele, Susanne: The Painter Family Bocksberger from Salzburg - Painting Between Reformation and the Italian Renaissance . Salzburg 2003.
- Goering, Max: The Younger Members of the Painter Family Bocksberger: A Contribution for the History of Mannersism Painting in South Germany . Knorr & Hirth, Munich 1930.
