= Great Piece of Turf =

1503 watercolour by Albrecht Dürer

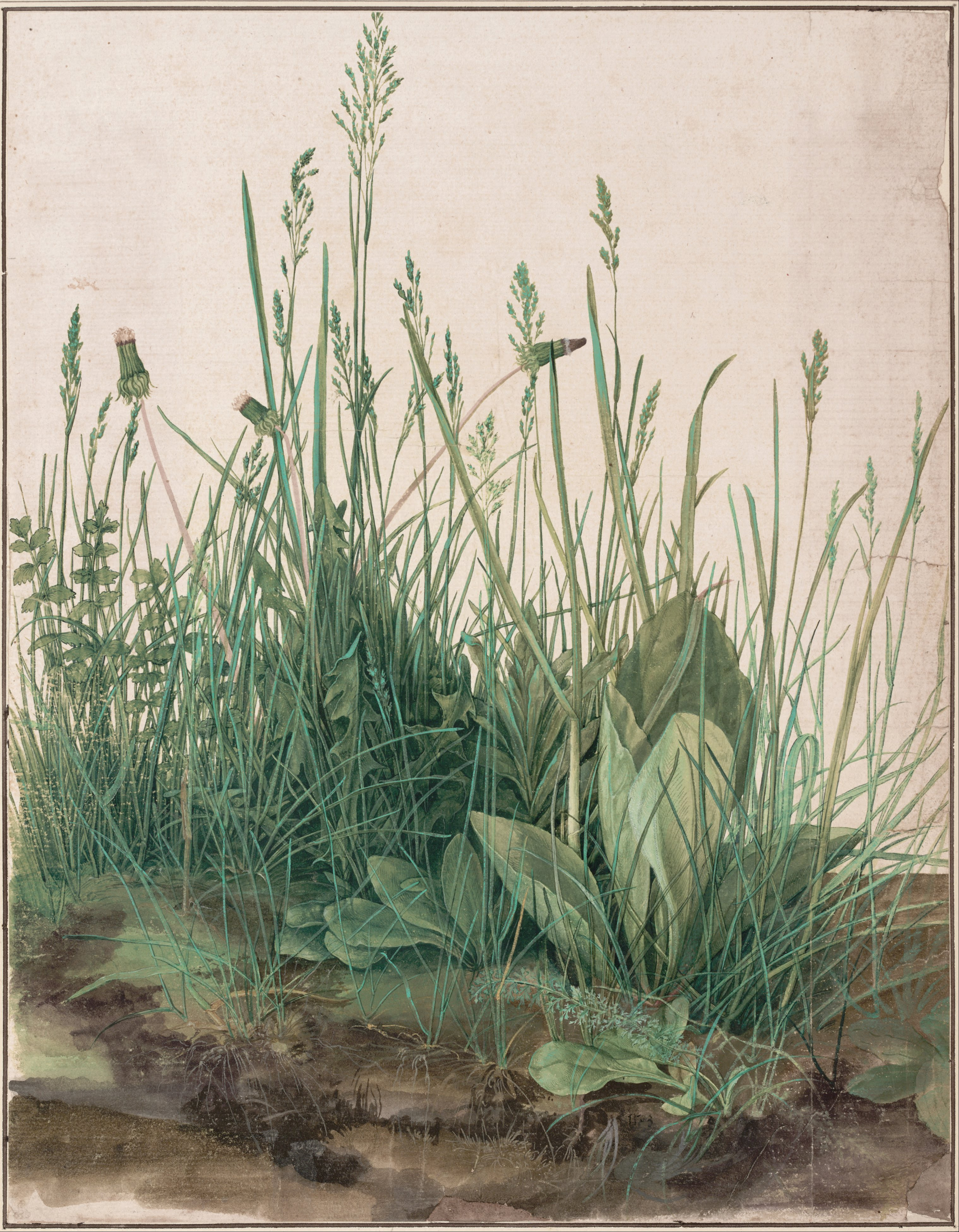
- Artist: Albrecht Dürer
- Year: 1503
- Type: Watercolour, gouache and highlights
- Dimensions: 40.3 cm × 31.1 cm (15 7/8 in × 12 1/4 in)
- Location: Albertina, Vienna

The Great Piece of Turf (German: Das große Rasenstück) is a watercolor painting by the German artist Albrecht Dürer, created during the Northern Renaissance. The painting, which at first glance seems to be a random assemblage of grass and plants, depicts an organized, monumental whole. Known by scholars to be one of Dürer's most important plant studies, its unconventional hyper-realism was revolutionary as it introduced an inorganic, peculiarly crisp portrayal of natural objects.

== Background ==
Although frequently described as a small-scale observational study, Great Piece of Turf holds a central place in Dürer's exploration of nature. Rather than functioning as a simple sketch, the work reflects a deliberate and methodical approach to plants and biology. These portrait-like depictions of plants are common in Frankish painting, which preceded Dürer.

The turf depicted corresponds to vegetation typically found in late April to early May, allowing us to date the work more precisely to a specific time of the year. The damaged edges to the paper exemplify that Dürer physically altered the paper.

Moritz Thausing described this work as a "lifesize marvel of botanical accuracy" for its realistic portrayal of an ordinary patch of grass. Fritz Koreny notes that the work has little precedent in the history of art and that it elevates everyday natural forms into a subject worthy of intense study and representation.

== Description ==
The composition presents a cluster of grass and small plants emerging from the ground, viewed from a low vantage point, which Klaus Schröder suggests is done so to invite the viewer to see the turf "from the perspective of a tiny animal." Individual blades vary in height and illumination, creating a layered and highly differentiated surface.

The visual field is unevenly distributed, with denser areas of plant life contrasted against open space in other areas. This arrangement yields what Joseph Koerner describes as a picture "without center and boundaries." Koerner observers that Dürer uses watercolor's natural property of transparency to reveal underlying structures, including plant roots, which are typically hidden from plain view. This exposure of subterranean elements dematerialized the ground on which the plants grow, unnaturally revealing the entirety of each piece of greenery. According to Donald Kuspit, the depiction of roots and stems contributes to the sense of analytical observation while also introducing an element of visual tension.

== Analysis ==
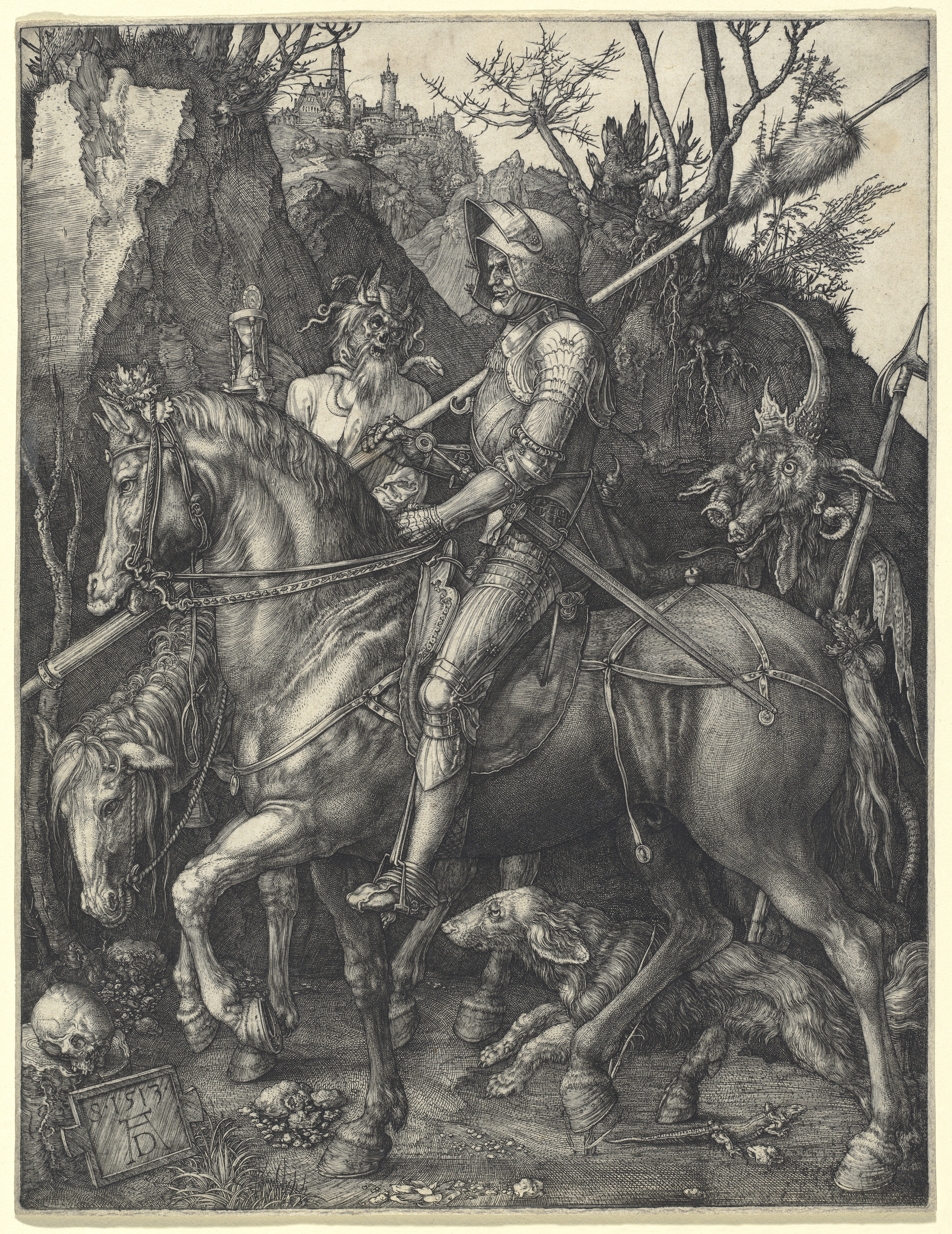
Albrecht Dürer's Knight, Death, and Devil 1513 engraving

Scholars emphasize that the work is not purely realistic despite its detailed appearance. Instead, it reflects what has been described as an "over-realistic" or highly constructed vision of nature. The exposure of hidden roots results in what Kuspit characterizes as an "inorganic" portrayal of organic forms. Kuspit has compared Dürer's depiction of the roots to Dürer's representation of faces in the Knight, Death, and Devil, created in 1513.

At a compositional level, the work balances unity and variety as Dürer preserves the individuality of each specific blade of grass. Schröder suggests that this duality constitutes the deeper meaning of the work, beyond the scope of the physical and technical attributes.

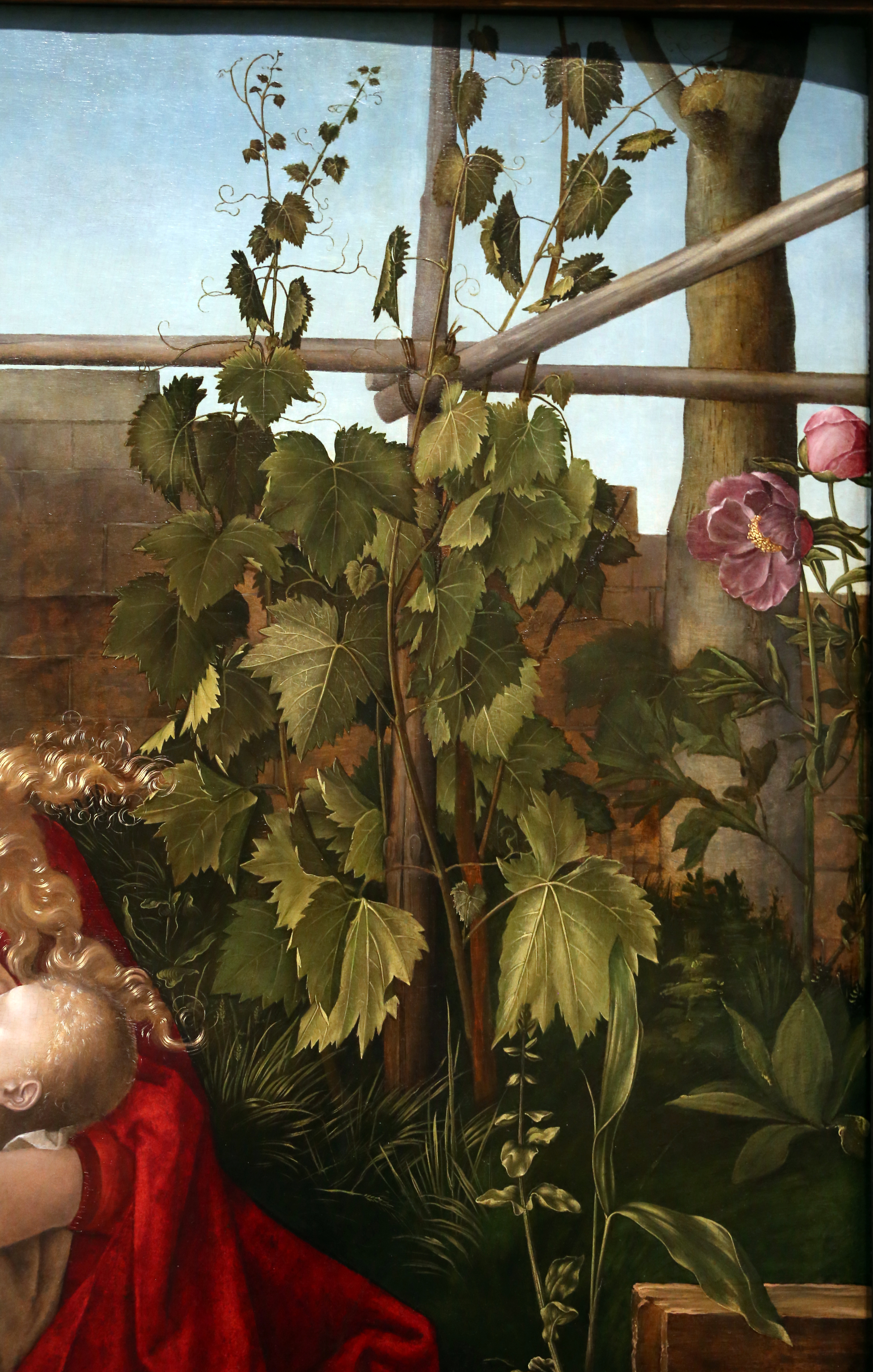
Albrecht Dürer's The Madonna with the Iris 1500-1510 oil painting

The impenetrable density found in the center of the work, surrounded by the haphazard dispersion of grass towards the outer edges, conveys the impression of narrowly focused vision. Koreny argues that Dürer’s combination of broad and fine brushwork, occasional penwork, "painterly boldness," and "draughtsmanly delicacy" enables him to clarify the dense botanical context while expressing the "dynamic, aspiring life of the vegetation"—an achievement Koreny says "exists nowhere else, even in Dürer’s work." Koreny notes that it is uncertain whether the picture served as a model of Dürer's other works, but he notes that certain botanical elements recur in other paintings, such as Düerer's Madonna with the Iris.

== See also ==
List of works by Albrecht
