= Léonard Gaultier =

French engraver

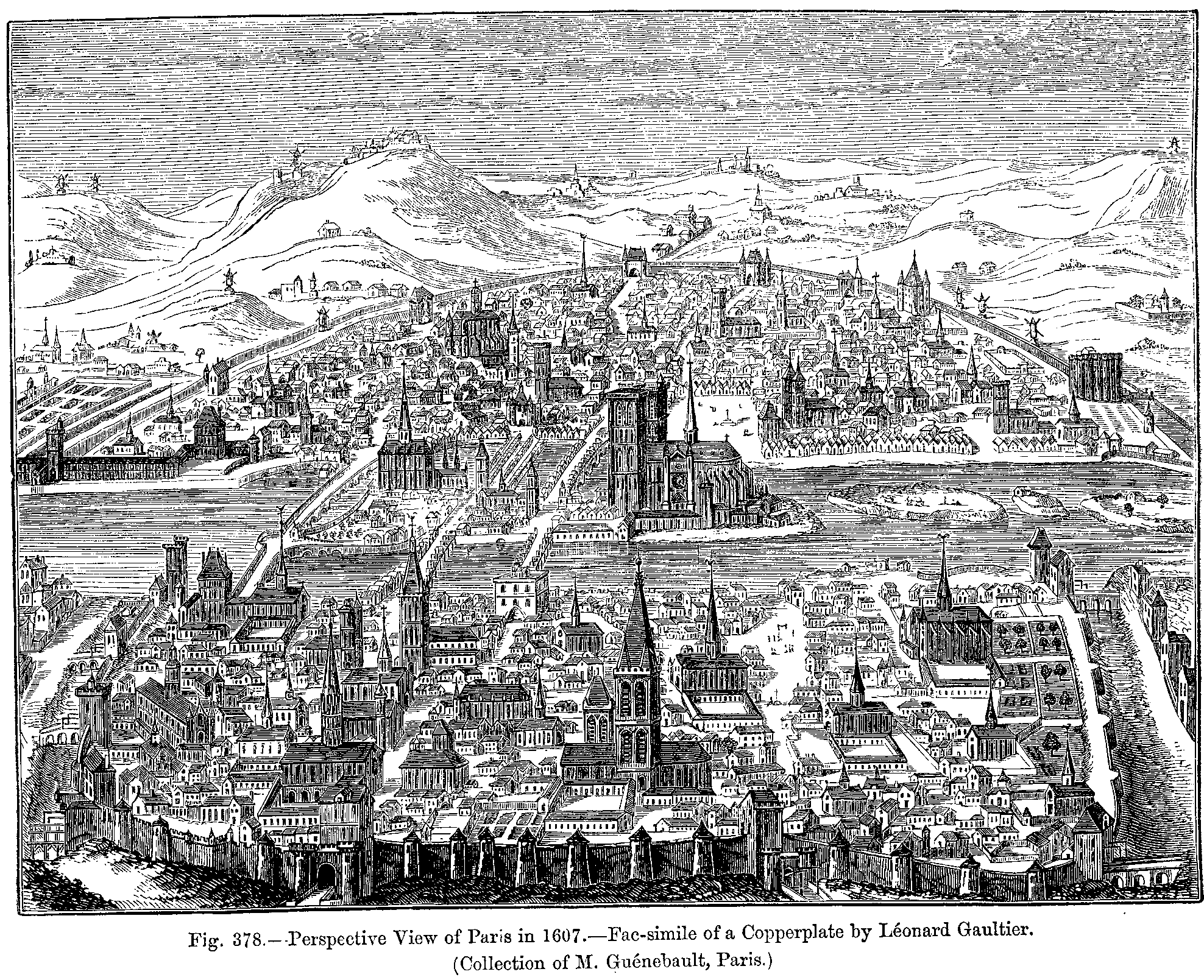
Perspective view of Paris in 1607

Léonard Gaultier, or, as he sometimes signed himself, Galter, a French engraver, was born at Mainz about 1561, and died in Paris in 1641. His style of work resembles that of Wierix and Crispyn van de Passe. His prints are executed entirely with the graver, with great precision, but in a stiff, formal manner. He must have been very laborious, as the Abbé de Marolles possessed upwards of eight hundred prints by him, many of which were after his own designs. They consist of portraits, and various subjects, of which the following are the most worthy of notice. They are sometimes signed with his name, and sometimes with a cipher GL.

== Portraits ==
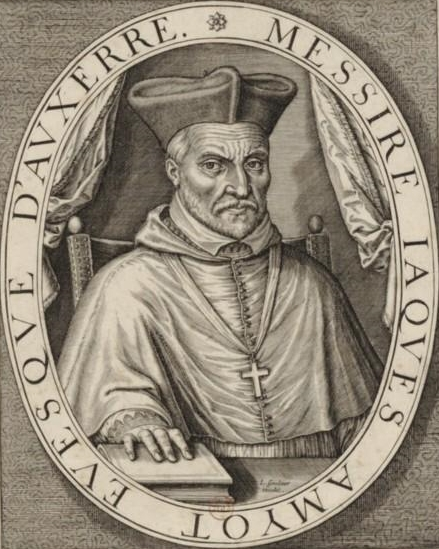
Jacques Amyot

- Henry IV of France.
- Henry, Duke of Montpensier.
- J. Amyot, Bishop of Auxerre.
- Alexandre Bouchart, Viscount de Blosseville.
- Philippe de Mornay, Seigneur du Plessis. 1611.
- Charles de Gontaut de Biron, Marshal of France.
- Étienne Pasquier.
- Jean Caron.

== Various subjects ==
- A set of small plates of subjects from the Old and New Testament.
- A set of the Prophets, Apostles, and Evangelists.
- Thirty-two plates of the History of Cupid and Psyche; after Raphael.
- The Procession of the League; a satirical print.
- The Family of Henry IV.; nine figures.
- The Assassination of Henry IV.
- The Coronation of Mary de' Medici. 1610.
- The Cyclops forging the Thunderbolts; after J. Cousin. 1581.
- A Sacrifice; after M. Fréminet.
- The Last Judgment; copied from Martin Rota's engraving after Michelangelo.
