= Madonna of Laroque =

Painting attributed to Leonardo da Vinci

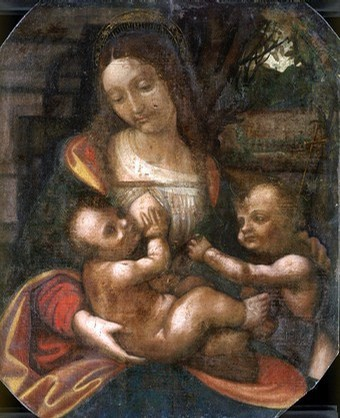
- Artist: Leonardo da Vinci
- Year: 1502–1503
- Dimensions: 48 cm × 59 cm (19 in × 23 in)

The Madonna of Laroque is an oil painting on a poplar board (48 cm / 59 cm), executed between 1502 and 1503. It depicts the Virgin nursing the Christ Child with the infant John the Baptist. There has been speculation that the painting may be by Leonardo da Vinci.
