= Paul Dax =

Austrian artist (1503–1561)

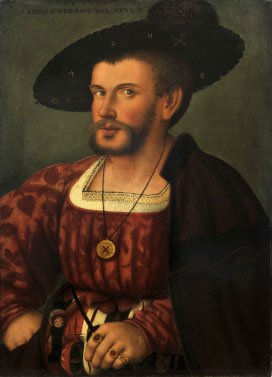
Paul Dax: Self-portrait, around 1530

Paul Dax (1503–1561) was an artist from the Holy Roman Empire. Paul Dax is known for his self-portrait dating to 1530, considered to be the earliest autonomous self-portrait from Austria.

Dax was born in the Tyrol. He led a very unsteady life, and after having gained reputation as a painter, he gave up art, and entered the army, engaging in several campaigns and the sieges of Naples, Florence, and Vienna.

In 1530 he devoted himself to glass-painting, and his works, which are of considerable merit, are now in the court-house of Innsbruck, and in the town-hall at Ensisheim, Alsace. He also published several maps of his country. His death occurred in 1561.
