= Pedro Campaña =

Spanish painter

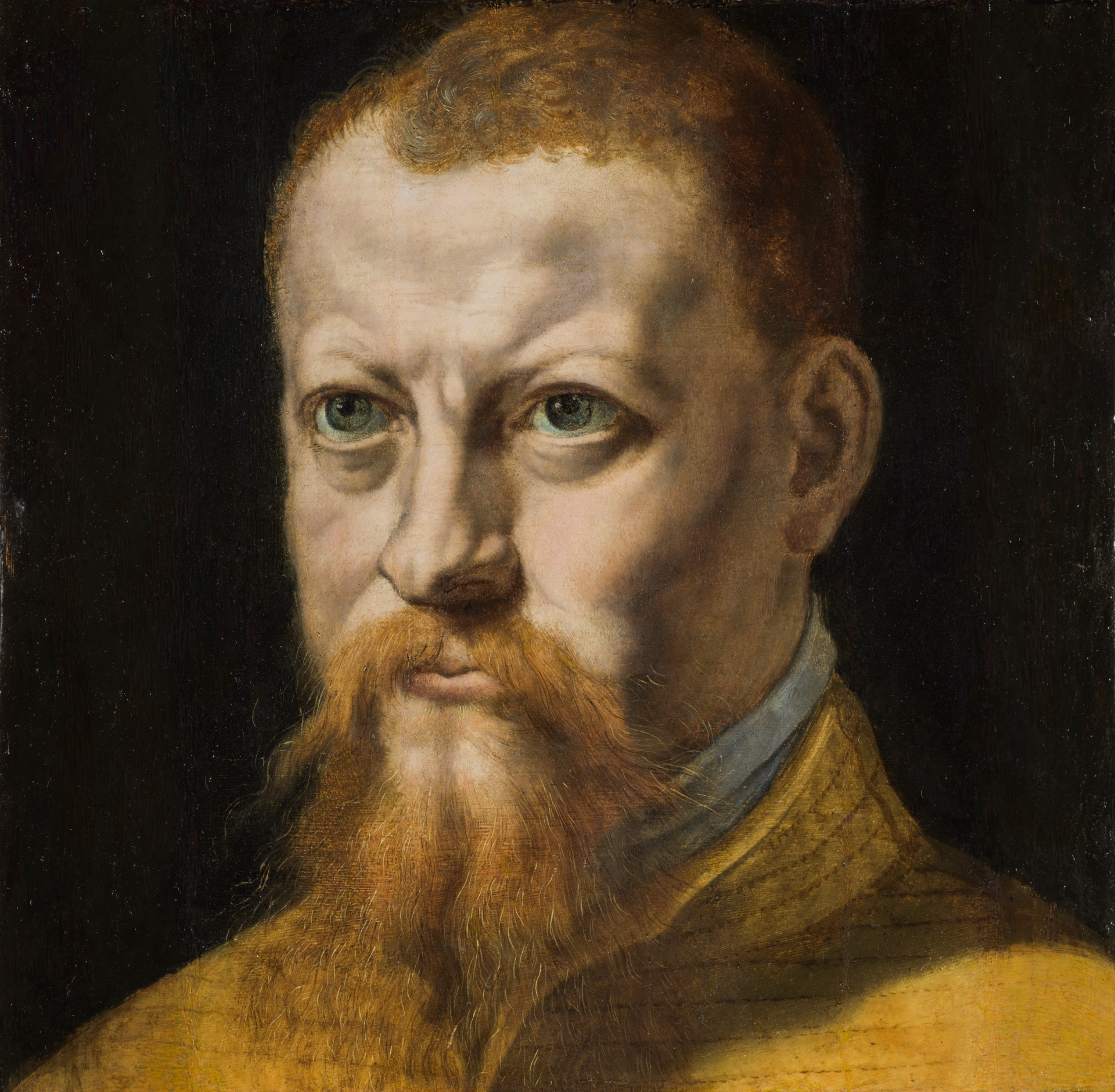
Selfportrait, c.1550. Museo del Prado.

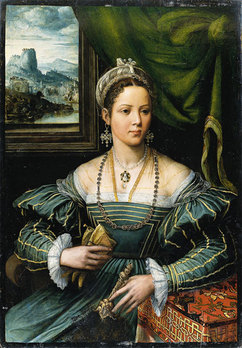
Portrait of a Lady.

Pedro Campaña (1503–1586) was a Flemish painter of the Renaissance period, mainly active in Italy and Spain. His actual name was Pieter de Kempeneer, translated into French as Champaigne, and was also known as Peter van de Velde.

== Biography ==
Born in Brussels, he trained there with Bernard Van Orley. His early life appears to have been spent in Italy, where he carefully studied the paintings of Raphael, and declared himself as his pupil. In 1530 he was at work at some scene-painting, representing a triumphal arch to be erected on the occasion of the coronation of Charles V, Holy Roman Emperor in Bologna, and he then left for Spain, on the advice, it is said, of Cardinal Marino Grimani, and spent the rest of his life in that country, only returning to Brussels about 1563 or 1565.

Between 1537 and 1562 he was associated with Luis de Vargas and the Italian sculptor Torregiano in establishing a school of painting in Seville, which eventually became the academy of the place; among the pupils educated in it was Morales. He painted for the monastery of St. Mary of Grace, Church of Santa Cruz, in the city, an altar-piece representing the Descent from the Cross (1548), which is now in the cathedral, having been removed there when the church fell into ruins. There are other works by the same painter in Seville Cathedral, especially two representing the Purification of the Virgin and the Resurrection, the impressive main retable of Santa Ana, and others in various churches of the city, such as San Isidoro, San Pedro, Santa Catalina, and San Juan de la Palma. One of his last works was the restoration and repainting of a chapel belonging to Hernando de Jaen, an important resident of Seville. Murillo requested that he be buried near Campaña's picture, and his burial took place in the Church of Santa Cruz, close underneath the Descent from the Cross, but the whole building was burned to the ground during the Napoleonic Wars, and the tomb perished.
