= List of artists in the Web Gallery of Art (A–K) =

The list of painters in the Web Gallery of Art is a list of the named painters in the Web Gallery of Art (WGA). The online collection contains roughly 34,000 images by 4,000 artists, but only named artists with oil paintings in the database are listed alphabetically here. The painter's name is followed by a title of one of their paintings and its location, which is hosted on the WGA website. For painters with more than one painting in the WGA collection, or for paintings by unnamed or unattributed artists, see the Web Gallery of Art website or the corresponding Wikimedia Commons painter category. Of the 2,463 painters in the WGA database, over a quarter are Italians and about a third were born in the 17th century, and they are mostly men. There are only 44 women, including Sofonisba Anguissola, Rosa Bonheur, Artemisia Gentileschi, Catharina van Hemessen, Angelica Kauffmann, Judith Leyster, Louise Moillon, Clara Peeters, Rachel Ruysch and Élisabeth Louise Vigée Le Brun. For the complete list of artists and information about their artworks in the WGA collection, the database can be downloaded as a compressed file from the website.

== A ==
- Hans von Aachen (1552–1614), 4 paintings : Allegory, Alte Pinakothek, Munich (url)
- Carl Frederik Aagaard (1833–1895), 2 paintings : Deer beside a Lake, private collection (url)
- Niccolò dell'Abbate (1509–1571), 4 paintings : Stag Hunt, Galleria Borghese, Rome (url)
- Giuseppe Abbati (1836–1868), 4 paintings : Landscape at Castiglioncello, Galleria dell'Arte Moderna, Palazzo Pitti, Florence (url)
- Nicolai Abildgaard (1743–1809), 1 painting : Culmin's Ghost Appears to his Mother, Nationalmuseum, Stockholm (url)
- Oswald Achenbach (1827–1905), 1 painting : Fireworks in Naples, The Hermitage, St. Petersburg (url)
- Salomon Adler (1630–1709), 1 painting : Self-Portrait, private collection (url)
- Alexander Adriaenssen (1587–1661), 4 paintings : Fish and Dead Game, The Hermitage, St. Petersburg (url)
- Willem van Aelst (1627–1683), 17 paintings : Breakfast Piece, Akademie der bildenden Künste, Vienna (url)
- Theodoor Aenvanck (1633–1690), 1 painting : Fruit, Koninklijk Museum voor Schone Kunsten, Antwerp (url)
- Pieter Aertsen (1508–1575), 19 paintings : Apostles Peter and John, The Hermitage, St. Petersburg (url)
- Jacques Laurent Agasse (1767–1849), 3 paintings : The Playground, Museum Oskar Reinhart, Winterthur (url)
- Ivan Konstantinovich Aivazovsky (1817–1900), 2 paintings : The Ninth Wave, State Russian Museum, St. Petersburg (url)
- Joseph van Aken (c. 1699–1749), 2 paintings : The Van Aken Brothers, private collection (url)
- Macrino d'Alba (1465–1470), 1 painting : Figure of a Saint, private collection (url)
- Francesco Albani (1578–1660), 15 paintings : Spring (Venus at her Toilet), Galleria Borghese, Rome (url)
- Mariotto Albertinelli (1474–1515), 4 paintings : Visitation, Galleria degli Uffizi, Florence (url)
- Francesco Albotto (1721–1757), 2 paintings : View of Campo Santi Giovanni e Paolo, Museo Nazionale di Capodimonte, Naples (url)
- José de Alcíbar (1725/30–1803), 1 painting : Portrait of María Anna Josefa Taking Vow, Szépmûvészeti Múzeum, Budapest (url)
- Ljubomir Aleksandrović (1828–1887), 1 painting : Grape Harvest Girl, National Museum, Belgrade (url) His name is spelled incorrectly on the Web Gallery
- Leonardo Alenza y Nieto (1807–1845), 2 paintings : Satire on Romantic Suicide, Museo Romántico, Madrid (url)
- Luís Alimbrot (1400–1460), 1 painting : Scenes from the Life of Christ, Museo del Prado, Madrid (url)
- Étienne Allegrain (1644–1736), 1 painting : Landscape with the Finding of Moses, The Hermitage, St. Petersburg (url)
- Alessandro Allori (1535–1607), 12 paintings : Allegory of Human Life, Galleria degli Uffizi, Florence (url)
- Cristofano Allori (1577–1621), 2 paintings : Judith with the Head of Holofernes, Royal Collection, Windsor (url)
- Washington Allston (1779–1843), 1 painting : Uriel Standing in the Sun, Mugar Memorial Library, Boston (url)
- Denis van Alsloot (1570–1626), 4 paintings : Skating during Carnival, Museo del Prado, Madrid (url)
- Albrecht Altdorfer (1480–1538), 14 paintings : The Battle of Alexander, Alte Pinakothek, Munich (url)
- Cristofano dell' Altissimo (c. 1525–1605), 2 paintings : Alchitrof, Emperor of Ethiopia, Galleria degli Uffizi, Florence (url)
- Francesco Antonio Altobello (1650–1692), 1 painting : Adoration of the Shepherds, private collection (url)
- Bartolomeo Altomonte (1694–1783), 1 painting : The Four Seasons Paying Homage to Chronos, Residenzgalerie, Salzburg (url)
- Martino Altomonte (b.1657–1745), 2 paintings : The Immaculate Conception, National Gallery of Slovenia, Ljubljana (url)
- Christoph Amberger (1505–1562), 5 paintings : Goldsmith Jörg Zürer of Augsburg, Museo del Prado, Madrid (url)
- Friedrich von Amerling (1803–1887), 9 paintings : Rudolf von Arthaber with his Children, Österreichische Galerie, Vienna (url)
- Jacopo Amigoni (1682–1752), 10 paintings : Joseph in the Pharaoh's Palace, Museo del Prado, Madrid (url)
- Anna Ancher (1859–1935), 2 paintings : Sunlight in the Blue Room. Helga Ancher Knitting in her Grandmother's Room, Skagens Museum, Skagen (url)
- Vito d' Ancona (1825–1884), 1 painting : Portrait of Gioacchino Rossini, Galleria Palatina (Palazzo Pitti), Florence (url)
- William Anderson (1757–1837), 4 paintings : The Capture of Fort Saint Louis, Martinique, National Maritime Museum, Greenwich (url)
- Andrea del Sarto (1486–1530), 37 paintings : The Annunciation, Galleria Palatina (Palazzo Pitti), Florence (url)
- Andrea di Bartolo (1360–1428), 2 paintings : Coronation of the Virgin, Pinacoteca di Brera, Milan (url)
- Ion Andreescu (1850–1882), 2 paintings : Edge of the Forest, Muzeul National de Arta, Bucharest (url)
- Jurriaan Andriessen (1742–1819), 2 paintings : Arcadian Landscape, private collection (url)
- Paolo Anesi (1697–1773), 5 paintings : An Extensive Landscape, private collection (url)
- Giuseppe Angeli (1712–1798), 5 paintings : The Immaculate Conception, Santa Maria Gloriosa dei Frari, Venice (url)
- Angeluccio (c. 1620 – c. 1650), 1 painting : Rural Scene, Galleria Nazionale d'Arte Antica, Rome (url)
- Johann Adalbert Angermayer (1674–1740), 1 painting : Bouquet of Flowers with Animals, Liechtenstein Museum, Vienna (url)
- Charles Angrand (1854–1926), 2 paintings : Couple in the Street, Musée d'Orsay, Paris (url)
- Lucia Anguissola (1538–1565), 2 paintings : Self-Portrait, Castello Sforzesco, Milan (url)
- Sofonisba Anguissola (1530–1635), 10 paintings : Bernardino Campi Painting Sofonisba Anguissola, Pinacoteca Nazionale, Siena (url)
- Louis Anquetin (1861–1932), 2 paintings : Avenue de Clichy – Five O'Clock in the Evening, Wadsworth Atheneum, Hartford (url)
- Giovanni Andrea Ansaldo (1584–1638), 2 paintings : Allegory of the Crowning of Ferdinando II de' Medici, Galleria Palatina (Palazzo Pitti), Florence (url)
- Michelangelo Anselmi (c. 1492–1556), 1 painting : Virgin in Glory Flanked by Sts John the Baptist and Stephen, Musée du Louvre, Paris (url)
- Aart van Antum (1579–1620), 1 painting : Sea Battle between Dutch and Spanish Boats, Staatliche Museen, Berlin (url)
- Cornelis Anthonisz. (1505–1552), 1 painting : Banquet of Members of Amsterdam's Crossbow Civic Guard, Historisch Museum, Amsterdam (url)
- Alexandre Antigna (1817–1878), 1 painting : The Lightning, Musée d'Orsay, Paris (url)
- José Antolínez (1635–1675), 9 paintings : Annunciation, The Hermitage, St. Petersburg (url)
- Antonello da Messina (1430–1479), 20 paintings : San Cassiano Altar, Kunsthistorisches Museum, Vienna (url)
- Antoniazzo Romano (c. 1430–1508/12), 1 painting : Madonna Enthroned with the Infant Christ and Saints, Galleria Nazionale d'Arte Antica, Rome (url)
- Aleksey Petrovich Antropov (1716–1795), 2 paintings : Portrait of Catherine II, The Hermitage, St. Petersburg (url)
- Andrea Appiani (1754–1817), 6 paintings : General Desaix, Musée National du Château, Versailles (url)
- Thomas van Apshoven (1622–1674), 1 painting : Landscape with a Musician, private collection (url)
- Ulrich Apt the Elder (c. 1460–1522), 1 painting : The Lamentation, Museo Thyssen-Bornemisza, Madrid (url)
- Alessandro Araldi (c. 1460 – c. 1530), 1 painting : Portrait of Barbara Pallavicino, Galleria degli Uffizi, Florence (url)
- Giuseppe Arcimboldo (1526–1593), 48 paintings : Maximilian II, His Wife and Three Children, Kunsthistorisches Museum, Vienna (url)
- Juan de Arellano (1614–1676), 11 paintings : Still-Life with a Basket of Flowers, Museo de Bellas Artes, Bilbao (url)
- Arent Arentsz (1585–1631), 1 painting : Fishermen and Farmers in a Landscape, Rijksmuseum, Amsterdam (url)
- Ivan Argunov (1727–1802), 2 paintings : Portrait of an Unknown Peasant, State Tretyakov Gallery, Moscow (url)
- Jacques d'Arthois (1613–1685), 4 paintings : Edge of a Wood, Musée du Louvre, Paris (url)
- Pieter Jansz van Asch (1603–1678), 3 paintings : River Landscape, Rijksmuseum, Amsterdam (url)
- William Ashford (c. 1746–1824), 2 paintings : View of Killarney, private collection (url)
- Julian Rossi Ashton (1851–1942), 1 painting : The Gold Washer, Art Gallery of New South Wales, Sidney (url)
- Amico Aspertini (c. 1475–1552), 2 paintings : Adoration of the Shepherds, Galleria degli Uffizi, Florence (url)
- Jan Asselijn (1615–1652), 11 paintings : Italian Landscape with the Ruins of a Roman Bridge and Aqueduct, Rijksmuseum, Amsterdam (url)
- Gioacchino Assereto (1600–1649), 4 paintings : Isaac Blessing Jacob, The Hermitage, St. Petersburg (url)
- Bartholomeus Assteyn (1607–1667), 1 painting : Still-Life, private collection (url)
- Balthasar van der Ast (1593–1656), 14 paintings : Still-Life with Apple Blossoms, Staatliche Museen, Berlin (url)
- Joseph Aved (1702–1766), 1 painting : Madame Crozat, Musée Fabre, Montpellier (url)
- Barent Avercamp (1612–1679), 2 paintings : Enjoying the Ice, Rijksmuseum, Amsterdam (url)
- Hendrick Avercamp (1585–1634), 13 paintings : Ice Landscape, Staatliches Museum, Schwerin (url)
- Massimo Taparelli, Marquis d' Azeglio (1798–1866), 1 painting : Arabs on Horseback, Galleria Palatina (Palazzo Pitti), Florence (url)

== B ==
- Dirck van Baburen (1595–1624), 6 paintings : The Capture of Christ with the Malchus Episode, Fondazione di Studi di Storia dell'Arte Roberto Longhi, Florence (url)
- Francesco Bacchiacca (1494–1557), 12 paintings : Deposition, Galleria degli Uffizi, Florence (url)
- Giovanni Battista Gaulli (1639–1709), 9 paintings : Apotheosis of St Ignatius, Galleria Nazionale d'Arte Antica, Rome (url)
- Jacob Adriaensz Backer (1608–1651), 7 paintings : Granida and Daifilo, The Hermitage, St. Petersburg (url)
- Jacob de Backer (c. 1545 – c. 1591), 4 paintings : Allegory of the Three Ages of Man, The Hermitage, St. Petersburg (url)
- Ludolf Bakhuizen (1631–1708), 9 paintings : Ships in Distress off a Rocky Coast, National Gallery of Art, Washington (url)
- Sisto Badalocchio (1585–after 1621), 4 paintings : The Entombment of Christ, Galleria Borghese, Rome (url)
- Derick Baegert (1476–1515), 3 paintings : The Bearing of the Cross, Westfälisches Landesmuseum, Münster (url)
- Cornelis de Baellieur (1607–1671), 3 paintings : Interior of a Collector's Gallery of Paintings and Objets d'Art, Musée du Louvre, Paris (url)
- Jan de Baen (1633–1702), 2 paintings : The Corpses of the De Witt Brothers, Rijksmuseum, Amsterdam (url)
- Albert Baertsoen (1866–1922), 1 painting : Ghent, Evening, Royal Museums of Fine Arts of Belgium, Brussels (url)
- Giovanni Baglione (1566–1643), 10 paintings : Clio, Musée des Beaux-Arts, Arras (url)
- David Bailly (1584–1657), 3 paintings : Portrait of a Man, Metropolitan Museum of Art, New York (url)
- Lazzaro Baldi (c. 1623–1703), 1 painting : Joseph and Potiphar's Wife, private collection (url)
- Hans Baldung (1484–1545), 22 paintings : The Knight, the Young Girl, and Death, Musée du Louvre, Paris (url)
- Hendrick van Balen (1575–1632), 7 paintings : Diana Turns Actaeon into a Stag, Szépmûvészeti Múzeum, Budapest (url)
- Antonio Balestra (1666–1740), 5 paintings : Adoration of the Shepherds, San Zaccaria, Venice (url)
- Pieter Balten (1525–1584), 1 painting : Christ on the Road to Calvary, private collection (url)
- Nicolò Bambini (1651–1736), 1 painting : Triumph of Venice, Palazzo Pesaro, Venice (url)
- Baccio Bandinelli (1493–1560), 2 paintings : Portrait of Michelangelo, Musée du Louvre, Paris (url)
- Cristiano Banti (1824–1904), 2 paintings : Three Peasant Women, Galleria Palatina (Palazzo Pitti), Florence (url)
- Miklós Barabás (1810–1898), 7 paintings : Portrait of János Buttler, Dobó István Vármúzeum, Eger (url)
- Jacopo de' Barbari (c. 1445–1516), 3 paintings : Virgin and Child Flanked by St John the Baptist and St Anthony Abbot, Musée du Louvre, Paris (url)
- Jean Barbault (1718–1762), 1 painting : Greek Sultana, Musée du Louvre, Paris (url)
- Paolo Antonio Barbieri (1603–1649), 1 painting : The Spice Shop, Pinacoteca Comunale, Spoleto (url)
- Pietro Bardellino (1728–1819), 2 paintings : Presentation of the Virgin at the Temple, private collection (url)
- Dirck Barendsz (1534–1592), 1 painting : The Last Judgment, Benedictine Abbey, Farfa, Latium (url)
- Federico Barocci (1530–1612), 17 paintings : Aeneas' Flight from Troy, Galleria Borghese, Rome (url)
- Didier Barra (1590–1644), 2 paintings : Landscape with Buildings, The Hermitage, St. Petersburg (url)
- Francisco Barrera (1603–1668), 4 paintings : The Month of May, Slovak National Gallery, Bratislava (url)
- George Barret, Sr. (1728–1784), 2 paintings : Landscape with a Watermill, private collection (url)
- Bartolomeo di Giovanni (1480–1510), 1 painting : The Adoration of the Magi, Fine Arts Museums of San Francisco, San Francisco (url)
- Bartolomeo Veneto (c. 1480 – c. 1546), 3 paintings : Woman Playing a Lute, Pinacoteca di Brera, Milan (url)
- Fra Bartolomeo (1472–1517), 6 paintings : Christ with the Four Evangelists, Galleria Palatina (Palazzo Pitti), Florence (url)
- Antoine-Louis Barye (1796–1875), 1 painting : Lions near their Den, Musée du Louvre, Paris (url)
- Marco Basaiti (1496–1530), 6 paintings : Portrait of Doge Agostino Barbarigo, Szépmûvészeti Múzeum, Budapest (url)
- Evaristo Baschenis (1617–1677), 10 paintings : Musical Instruments, Royal Museums of Fine Arts of Belgium, Brussels (url)
- Francesco Bassano the Younger (1549–1592), 13 paintings : Adoration of the Magi, The Hermitage, St. Petersburg (url)
- Jacopo Bassano (1510–1592), 37 paintings : The Annunciation to the Shepherds, Belvoir Castle, Leicestershire, England (url)
- Leandro Bassano (1557–1622), 11 paintings : St Giacinto Walking on the Water of the River Dnieper, Basilica dei Santi Giovanni e Paolo, Venice (url)
- Bartholomeus van Bassen (1590–1652), 7 paintings : The Tomb of William the Silent in an Imaginary Church, Szépmûvészeti Múzeum, Budapest (url)
- Marco Antonio Bassetti (1588–1630), 6 paintings : Portrait of an Old Man with Gloves, Museo di Castelvecchio, Verona (url)
- Lazzaro Bastiani (before 1430–1512), 2 paintings : Communion of St Jerome, Gallerie dell'Accademia, Venice (url)
- Jules Bastien-Lepage (1848–1884), 1 painting : Haymaking, private collection (url)
- Pompeo Batoni (1708–1787), 20 paintings : Achilles and the Centaur Chiron, Galleria degli Uffizi, Florence (url)
- Gerrit Battem (1636–1684), 2 paintings : Domestic Scene, private collection (url)
- Lubin Baugin (c. 1610–1663), 3 paintings : Still-Life with Candle, Galleria Spada, Rome (url)
- Paul Baum (1859–1932), 1 painting : Landscape, Berlinische Galerie, Berlin (url)
- Francisco Bayeu y Subias (1734–1795), 3 paintings : Lunch on the Field, Museo del Prado, Madrid (url)
- Ramón Bayeu y Subias (1746–1793), 2 paintings : The Blind Singer, Museo del Prado, Madrid (url)
- Frédéric Bazille (1841–1870), 11 paintings : Girl in a Pink Dress, Musée d'Orsay, Paris (url)
- Giuseppe Bazzani (1690–1769), 3 paintings : The Agony of Christ in the Garden, Galleria degli Uffizi, Florence (url)
- Thomas Beach (1738–1806), 1 painting : Portrait of the Children of Charles Blair, private collection (url)
- Mary Beale (1633–1699), 1 painting : Portrait of the Artist's Husband Charles Beale, private collection (url)
- Charles Beaubrun (1604–1692), 1 painting : Portrait of Mademoiselle de Montpensier, Museo del Prado, Madrid (url)
- Jacques-Antoine Beaufort (1721–1784), 1 painting : The Oath of Brutus, Musée Municipal Frederic Blandin, Nevers (url)
- Cecilia Beaux (1855–1942), 2 paintings : Charles Sumner Bird and His Sister Edith Bird Bass, Museum of Fine Arts, Boston (url)
- Domenico di Pace Beccafumi (1484–1551), 17 paintings : Trinity (detail), Pinacoteca Nazionale, Siena (url)
- Francesco Beccaruzzi (ca. 1492–before 1563), 2 paintings : A Ballplayer and His Page, Staatliche Museen, Berlin (url)
- William Beechey (1753–1839), 4 paintings : George IV when Prince of Wales, Metropolitan Museum of Art, New York (url)
- Andries Beeckman (1630–1663), 1 painting : The Castle of Batavia, Seen from Kali Besar West, Rijksmuseum, Amsterdam (url)
- Joos de Beer (1425–1593), 4 paintings : Triptych, Pinacoteca di Brera, Milan (url)
- Anthonie Beerstraaten (1637–1664), 2 paintings : Skating near a Town Wall, private collection (url)
- Jan Abrahamsz Beerstraaten (1622–1666), 4 paintings : Village of Nieukoop in Winter with Child Funeral, Szépmûvészeti Múzeum, Budapest (url)
- Osias Beert (1580–1623), 7 paintings : Bouquet in a Niche, Rockox House, Antwerp (url)
- Cornelis Pietersz Bega (1620–1664), 7 paintings : Alchemist, J. Paul Getty Museum, Los Angeles (url)
- Carl Begas the Elder (1794–1854), 1 painting : The Begas Family, Wallraf-Richartz-Museum, Cologne (url)
- Abraham Begeyn (1637–1697), 3 paintings : Seashore, The Hermitage, St. Petersburg (url)
- Barthel Beham (1502–1540), 3 paintings : Portrait of Duke Ludwig X of Bavaria, Liechtenstein Museum, Vienna (url)
- Édouard Béliard (1832–1912), 1 painting : Banks of the Oise, Musée Municipal d'Étampes, Étampes (url)
- Jean-Baptiste Belin de Fontenay (1653–1715), 2 paintings : Flowers in a Gold Vase, Bust of Louis XIV, Horn of Plenty and Armour, Musée du Louvre, Paris (url)
- Stefano della Bella (1610–1664), 1 painting : Nocturnal Carousel in the Amphitheatre of the Boboli Gardens, Alberto Bruschi Collection, Grassina (url)
- Jacques Bellange (1594–1638), 1 painting : Lamentation, The Hermitage, St. Petersburg (url)
- Alexis Simon Belle (1674–1734), 1 painting : Portrait of Louis XV, private collection (url)
- Jehan Bellegambe (c. 1470 – c. 1535), 3 paintings : Annunciation, The Hermitage, St. Petersburg (url)
- Gentile Bellini (1430–1507), 1 painting : Mehmet II, National Gallery, London (url)
- Giovanni Bellini (1435–1516), 116 paintings : Madonna with the Child, Museo Correr, Venice (url)
- Antonio De Bellis (c. 1616 – c. 1656), 2 paintings : St Catherine, private collection (url)
- Marco Bello (1470–1523), 2 paintings : Sacra Conversazione, private collection (url)
- Pietro Bellotti (1627–1700), 3 paintings : Geography Lesson, private collection (url)
- Bernardo Bellotto (1720–1780), 36 paintings : Rio dei Mendicanti with the Scuola di San Marco, Gallerie dell'Accademia, Venice (url)
- Antonio Bellucci (1654–1726), 6 paintings : Antiochus and Stratonice, Staatliche Museen, Kassel (url)
- Andrea Belvedere (1652–1732), 2 paintings : Flowers and Ducks, Galleria Palatina (Palazzo Pitti), Florence (url)
- Francesco Benaglio (c. 1430 – c. 1492), 1 painting : Virgin and Child, Museo Correr, Venice (url)
- Gyula Benczúr (1844–1920), 6 paintings : László Hunyadi's Farewell, Magyar Nemzeti Galéria, Budapest (url)
- Andries Benedetti (c. 1615–after 1649), 2 paintings : Still-Life, Galleria Cesare Lampronti, Rome (url)
- Marie-Guillemine Benoist (1768–1826), 1 painting : Portrait of a Negress, Musée du Louvre, Paris (url)
- François-Léon Benouville (1821–1859), 2 paintings : The Wrath of Achilles, Musée Fabre, Montpellier (url)
- Achille Benouville (1815–1891), 1 painting : The Campagna at Lungezza near Rome, Museum of Fine Arts, Houston (url)
- Ambrosius Benson (1484–1550), 5 paintings : Mary Magdalene, Galleria Franchetti, Ca' d'Oro, Venice (url)
- Frank Weston Benson (1862–1951), 2 paintings : The Black Hat, Museum of Art, Rhode Island School of Design, Providence (url)
- Willem Benson (1521–1574), 1 painting : The Nativity, Royal Collection, Windsor (url)
- Pietro Benvenuti (1769–1844), 3 paintings : Elisa Bonaparte and Her Daughter, Musée National du Château, Fontainebleau (url)
- Jean Béraud (1849–1935), 4 paintings : On the Boulevard, Musée Carnavalet, Paris (url)
- Nicolaes Pieterszoon Berchem (1620–1683), 22 paintings : Rest, Metropolitan Museum of Art, New York (url)
- Gerrit Adriaenszoon Berckheyde (1638–1698), 10 paintings : The Bend in the Herengracht in Amsterdam, Rijksmuseum, Amsterdam (url)
- Job Adriaenszoon Berckheyde (1630–1692), 4 paintings : The Baker, Worcester Art Museum, Worcester (url)
- Christian Berentz (1658–1722), 4 paintings : Flowers, Fruit with a Woman Picking Grapes, Museo Nazionale di Capodimonte, Naples (url)
- Dirck van der Bergen (1645–1689), 1 painting : Landscape, The Hermitage, St. Petersburg (url)
- Pierre-Nolasque Bergeret (1782–1863), 2 paintings : Charles V Picking up Titian's Paintbrush, Musée des Beaux-Arts, Bordeaux (url)
- Gillis Gillisz. de Bergh (1600–1669), 1 painting : Still-Life, Gemeente Musea, Delft (url)
- Augustin van den Berghe (1756–1836), 3 paintings : The Naked Warrior (The Archer), Groeninge Museum, Bruges (url)
- Charles-Auguste van den Berghe (1798–1853), 1 painting : View of the Dogana in Venice, private collection (url)
- Christoffel van den Berghe (1590–1638), 2 paintings : Winter Landscape, Metropolitan Museum of Art, New York (url)
- Ambrogio Bergognone (c. 1453–1523), 3 paintings : Madonna and Child, St Catherine and the Blessed Stefano Maconi, Pinacoteca di Brera, Milan (url)
- Antoine Berjon (1754–1843), 1 painting : Still-Life with a Basket of Flowers, Musée du Louvre, Paris (url)
- Bartolomé Bermejo (c. 1436–1440 – c. 1498), 2 paintings : Christ at the Tomb Supported by Two Angels, Museo de Castillo, Perelada (url)
- Bernard d'Agesci (1756–1829), 1 painting : Lady Reading the Letters of Heloise and Abélard, Art Institute, Chicago (url)
- Émile Bernard (1868–1941), 5 paintings : The Harvest (Breton Landscape), Musée d'Orsay, Paris (url)
- Gian Lorenzo Bernini (1598–1680), 7 paintings : Saint Andrew and Saint Thomas, National Gallery, London (url)
- Alonso Berruguete (1488–1561), 2 paintings : Salome, Galleria degli Uffizi, Florence (url)
- Pedro Berruguete (1450–1504), 12 paintings : Adoration of the Magi, Museo del Prado, Madrid (url)
- Jean-Simon Berthélemy (1743–1811), 1 painting : Reclining Bacchante Playing the Cymbals, private collection (url)
- Jean-Victor Bertin (1767–1842), 2 paintings : Landscape with a Fortress and a Beggar, private collection (url)
- Nicolas Bertin (1668–1736), 1 painting : Phaethon on the Chariot of Apollo, Musée du Louvre, Paris (url)
- Jacopo Bertoia (1544–1574), 1 painting : Venus Led by Cupid to the Dead Adonis, Musée du Louvre, Paris (url)
- Aureliano de Beruete (1845–1912), 5 paintings : Hawthorn in Blossom, Museo del Prado, Madrid (url)
- Paul-Albert Besnard (1849–1934), 1 painting : Portrait of Madame Roger Jourdain, Musée des Arts Décoratifs, Paris (url)
- Bartolomeo Bettera (1639 – c. 1688), 2 paintings : Musical Instruments with Two Glass Spheres and a Male Bust, private collection (url)
- Joachim Beuckelaer (1533–1574), 21 paintings : Christ on the Cross, Musée du Louvre, Paris (url)
- Abraham van Beijeren (1620–1690), 15 paintings : Banquet Still-Life, Mauritshuis, The Hague (url)
- Bartolomeo Bezzi (fl. c. 1530), 1 painting : The Holy Family with St John the Baptist, Museum of Art, Indianapolis (url)
- Giuseppe Bezzuoli (1784–1855), 2 paintings : Entry of Charles VIII into Florence, Galleria dell'Arte Moderna, Palazzo Pitti, Florence (url)
- Biagio d'Antonio (1446–1516), 2 paintings : Portrait of a Boy, National Gallery of Art, Washington (url)
- Pietro Bianchi (1694–1740), 1 painting : St Francis of Paola in Ecstasy, Musée du Louvre, Paris (url)
- Neri di Bicci (1418–1492), 1 painting : The Coronation of the Virgin, Musée du Petit Palais, Avignon (url)
- Jean-Joseph-Xavier Bidauld (1758–1846), 5 paintings : View of the Isle of Sora, Musée du Louvre, Paris (url)
- Albert Bierstadt (1830–1902), 1 painting : Yosemite Valley at Sunset, private collection (url)
- Trophime Bigot (c. 1600–1650), 3 paintings : Boy Singeing a Bat's Wings, Galleria Doria Pamphilj, Rome (url)
- Jan van Bijlert (1597–1671), 11 paintings : Music-making Company, Akademie der bildenden Künste, Vienna (url)
- Giovanni Biliverti (1576–1644), 4 paintings : Angelica Hides from Ruggiero, Galleria Palatina (Palazzo Pitti), Florence (url)
- Bartolomeo Bimbi (1648–1730), 9 paintings : Plums, Villa Medici, Poggio a Caiano (url)
- George Caleb Bingham (1811–1879), 1 painting : Fur Traders Descending the Missouri, Metropolitan Museum of Art, New York (url)
- Hugo Birger (1854–1887), 1 painting : Scandinavian Artists Breakfasting at the Café Ledoyen, Paris, on Salon Opening Day, Konstmuseum, Gothenburg (url)
- Bartolomeo Biscaino (1629–1657), 3 paintings : Adoration of the Magi, Musée des Beaux-Arts, Strasbourg (url)
- Giuseppe Bernardino Bison (1762–1844), 1 painting : Piazza San Marco in Venice, private collection (url)
- Abraham Busschop (1670–1729), 3 paintings : Birds in a Landscape, private collection (url)
- Cornelis Bisschop (1630–1674), 4 paintings : A Young Woman and a Cavalier, Metropolitan Museum of Art, New York (url)
- Jacques Blanchard (1600–1638), 7 paintings : Allegory of Charity, Toledo Museum of Art, Toledo, Ohio (url)
- Pharamond Blanchard (1805–1873), 1 painting : Paul and Virginia, private collection (url)
- Thomas Blanchet (1614–1689), 1 painting : Landscape with Sarcophagus, The Hermitage, St. Petersburg (url)
- Carl Blechen (1797–1840), 17 paintings : Self-Portrait, Nationalgalerie, Berlin (url)
- Dirck Bleker (1621–1690), 1 painting : The Penitent Mary Magdalen, Rijksmuseum, Amsterdam (url)
- Gerrit Claesz Bleker (1592–1656), 3 paintings : Stag Hunting in the Dunes, Frans Hals Museum, Haarlem (url)
- Herri met de Bles (c. 1510), 8 paintings : Road to Calvary, University Art Museum, Princeton (url)
- Benjamin Block (1631–1689), 2 paintings : Portrait of Count Ferenc Nádasdy, Historical Picture Gallery, Hungarian National Museum, Budapest (url)
- Abraham Bloemaert (1564–1651), 15 paintings : Adoration of the Magi, Musée des Beaux-Arts, Grenoble (url)
- Hendrick Bloemaert (1601–1672), 1 painting : Portrait of a Gentleman, private collection (url)
- Jan Frans van Bloemen (1662–1749), 8 paintings : Landscape with a Fountain, The Hermitage, St. Petersburg (url)
- Norbert van Bloemen (1670–1746), 3 paintings : Genre Scene, The Hermitage, St. Petersburg (url)
- Peter van Bloemen (1657–1720), 4 paintings : Open-Air Manege, The Hermitage, St. Petersburg (url)
- Reyer van Blommendael (1628–1675), 2 paintings : Paris and Oenone, Palais des Beaux-Arts, Lille (url)
- Lancelot Blondeel (1498–1561), 1 painting : St Luke Painting the Virgin's Portrait, Groeninge Museum, Bruges (url)
- Merry-Joseph Blondel (1781–1853), 2 paintings : Portrait of Félicité-Louise de Durfort, Maréchale de Beurnonville, private collection (url)
- Pieter de Bloot (1601–1658), 6 paintings : Christ in the House of Mary and Martha, Liechtenstein Museum, Vienna (url)
- Geronimo de Bobadilla (c. 1620–1709), 1 painting : Christ the Saviour, The Hermitage, St. Petersburg (url)
- Pedro Atanasio Bocanegra (1638–1689), 1 painting : St Dominic in Soriano, The Hermitage, St. Petersburg (url)
- Boccaccio Boccaccino (before 1466–1525), 4 paintings : Gypsy Girl, Galleria degli Uffizi, Florence (url)
- Camillo Boccaccino (1501–1546), 1 painting : The Prophet David, Palazzo Farnese, Piacenza (url)
- Arnold Böcklin (1827–1901), 8 paintings : Campagna Landscape, Nationalgalerie, Berlin (url)
- Hans Bocksberger the Elder (ca. 1510–before 1569), 1 painting : Emperor Ferdinand I, Kunsthistorisches Museum, Vienna (url)
- Jan Boeckhorst (1604–1688), 1 painting : Christ on the Cross, private collection (url)
- Pieter Boel (1626–1673), 7 paintings : Still-Life with Dead Wild-Duck, Národní Galerie, Prague (url)
- Maerten Boelema de Stomme (1611–1644), 3 paintings : Still-Life with a Bearded Man Crock and a Nautilus Shell Cup, Royal Museums of Fine Arts of Belgium, Brussels (url)
- Jakob Bogdani (1660–1724), 10 paintings : Still-life with Birds, Magyar Nemzeti Galéria, Budapest (url)
- Louis-Léopold Boilly (1761–1845), 12 paintings : At the Entrance, The Hermitage, St. Petersburg (url)
- Ferdinand Bol (1616–1680), 14 paintings : Portrait of a Man, Alte Pinakothek, Munich (url)
- Hans Bol (1534–1593), 2 paintings : Village Feast (Annual Fair), Rockox House, Antwerp (url)
- Giovanni Boldini (1842–1931), 4 paintings : Alaide Banti in White Dress, Galleria dell'Arte Moderna, Palazzo Pitti, Florence (url)
- Heinrich Bollandt (1577 – c. 1651), 1 painting : Erdmann August, Crown Prince of Brandenburg-Bayreuth, Jagdschloss Grunewald, Berlin (url)
- Hans Gillisz. Bollongier (1600–1673), 3 paintings : Flower Piece, Frans Halsmuseum, Haarlem (url)
- Giovanni Antonio Boltraffio (1467–1516), 10 paintings : St Barbara, Staatliche Museen, Berlin (url)
- Sebastiano Bombelli (1635–1719), 2 paintings : Portrait of the Procurator Girolamo Querini, Fondazione Querini Stampalia, Venice (url)
- Carlo Bonavia (c. 1731–1788), 1 painting : Baia Bay, The Hermitage, St. Petersburg (url)
- Rosa Bonheur (1822–1899), 1 painting : The Horse Fair, Metropolitan Museum of Art, New York (url)
- Bonifazio Veronese (1487–1553), 15 paintings : Adoration of the Shepherds, The Hermitage, St. Petersburg (url)
- Richard Parkes Bonington (1802–1828), 6 paintings : On the Adriatic, Musée du Louvre, Paris (url)
- Giuseppe Bonito (1707–1789), 1 painting : The Repose of the Huntsmen, private collection (url)
- Léon Bonnat (1833–1922), 2 paintings : Jules Grévy, Musée d'Orsay, Paris (url)
- Pietro Paolo Bonzi (c. 1576–1636), 4 paintings : Landscape with Shepherds and Sheep, Pinacoteca Capitolina, Rome (url)
- Arnold Boonen (1669–1729), 1 painting : A Young Man Seated at a Table, private collection (url)
- Paulus Bor (1601–1669), 6 paintings : Ariadne, Muzeum Narodowe, Poznan (url)
- Hendrik van der Borcht the elder (1583–1651), 2 paintings : Forest Landscape, Castle Rájec nad Svitavou, Czech Republic (url)
- Paris Bordone (1500–1571), 16 paintings : Allegory with Lovers, Kunsthistorisches Museum, Vienna (url)
- Orazio Borgianni (1574–1616), 6 paintings : St Carlo Borromeo, Chiesa di San Carlo alle Quattro Fontane, Rome (url)
- Vladimir Borovikovsky (1757–1825), 7 paintings : Portrait of the Peasant Woman Christina, State Tretyakov Gallery, Moscow (url)
- Odoardo Borrani (1833–1905), 3 paintings : Sand Diggers on the Mugnone, Galleria dell'Arte Moderna, Palazzo Pitti, Florence (url)
- Nicolás Borrás (1530–1610), 2 paintings : The Adoration of the Magi, private collection (url)
- Giuseppe Borsato (1770–1849), 2 paintings : Commemoration of Canova in the Scuola Grande della Carità, Museo d'Arte Moderna, Ca' Pesaro, Venice (url)
- József Borsos (1821–1883), 5 paintings : Officer of the National Guard, Magyar Nemzeti Múzeum, Budapest (url)
- Anthonie van Borssom (1631–1677), 4 paintings : Barnyard Scene, Metropolitan Museum of Art, New York (url)
- Hieronymus Bosch (1450–1516), 124 paintings : Head of a Woman (fragment), Museum Boijmans Van Beuningen, Rotterdam (url)
- Abraham Bosschaert (1612–1643), 1 painting : Flowers in a Glass Vase, private collection (url)
- Ambrosius Bosschaert (1573–1621), 8 paintings : Bouquet of Flowers, Musée du Louvre, Paris (url)
- Ambrosius Bosschaert II (1609–1645), 2 paintings : Still-Life of Fruit, private collection (url)
- Jan-Baptist Bosschaert (1667–1746), 6 paintings : Flower Piece, Groeninge Museum, Bruges (url)
- Johannes Bosschaert (1607–1629), 1 painting : Basket of Flowers, Musée du Louvre, Paris (url)
- Abraham Bosse (1602–1676), 1 painting : The Five Senses: Hearing, Musée des Beaux-Arts, Tours (url)
- Andries Both (1612–1642), 1 painting : Hunting by Candlelight, Szépmûvészeti Múzeum, Budapest (url)
- Jan Dirksz Both (1618–1652), 7 paintings : Italian Landscape with Draughtsman, Rijksmuseum, Amsterdam (url)
- Giuseppe Bottani (1717–1784), 1 painting : Hagar and the Angel, Musée du Louvre, Paris (url)
- Sandro Botticelli (1444–1510), 2 paintings : The Return of Judith to Bethulia, Galleria degli Uffizi, Florence (url)
- Francesco Botticini (b.1446–1497), 2 paintings : Madonna with Child, St John the Baptist, and Angels, Galleria Palatina (Palazzo Pitti), Florence (url)
- François Boucher (1703–1770), 55 paintings : The Afternoon Meal, Musée du Louvre, Paris (url)
- Peter van Boucle (1610–1673), 3 paintings : Still-Life with Fruit and Game, private collection (url)
- Victor Boucquet (1619–1677), 1 painting : The Standard Bearer, Musée du Louvre, Paris (url)
- Adriaen Frans Boudewyns (1644–1719), 1 painting : Landscape with Travellers, private collection (url)
- Eugène Boudin (1824–1898), 14 paintings : Beach Scene, Trouville, Metropolitan Museum of Art, New York (url)
- William-Adolphe Bouguereau (1825–1905), 3 paintings : Bathers, Art Institute, Chicago (url)
- Michel Bouillon (1616–1654), 2 paintings : Still-Life, private collection (url)
- Gustave Boulanger (1824–1888), 1 painting : Theatrical Rehearsal in the House of an Ancient Rome Poet, The Hermitage, St. Petersburg (url)
- Bon Boullogne (1649–1717), 2 paintings : Jephtha's Daughter, The Hermitage, St. Petersburg (url)
- Louis Boullogne (1609–1674), 2 paintings : Earth, Schloss Sanssouci, Berlin (url)
- Sébastien Bourdon (1616–1671), 16 paintings : Adoration of the Magi, Schloss Sanssouci, Berlin (url)
- Esaias Boursse (1631–1672), 3 paintings : Dutch Interior with Woman Sewing, Staatliche Museen, Berlin (url)
- Pieter Bout (1630–1700), 2 paintings : Landscape, private collection (url)
- Charles-Marie Bouton (1781–1853), 2 paintings : Gothic Chapel, Metropolitan Museum of Art, New York (url)
- Dieric Bouts (1415–1475), 50 paintings : Christ in the House of Simon, Staatliche Museen, Berlin (url)
- Dieric Bouts II (1448–1491), 4 paintings : The Pearl of Brabant, Alte Pinakothek, Munich (url)
- André Bouys (1656–1740), 2 paintings : La Récureuse, Musée des Arts décoratifs, Paris (url)
- Marie Bracquemond (1840–1916), 3 paintings : On the Terrace at Sèvres, Musée du Petit Palais, Geneva (url)
- Richard Brakenburgh (1650–1702), 3 paintings : May Queen Festival, Szépmûvészeti Múzeum, Budapest (url)
- Bramantino (c. 1460–1530), 5 paintings : Adoration of the Magi, National Gallery, London (url)
- Leonaert Bramer (1596–1674), 12 paintings : The Adoration of the Magi, Institute of Arts, Detroit (url)
- Christian Hilfgott Brand (1694–1756), 1 painting : "Par force" Hunting, private collection (url)
- Johann Christian Brand (1722–1795), 3 paintings : Parable of the Workers in the Vineyard, Akademie der bildenden Künste, Vienna (url)
- Domenico Brandi (1683–1736), 3 paintings : Pastoral Scene, The Hermitage, St. Petersburg (url)
- Giacinto Brandi (1621–1691), 1 painting : Christ in the Garden of Gethsemane, Pinacoteca, Vatican (url)
- Dirck de Bray (1635–1694), 1 painting : Still-Life with Symbols of the Virgin Mary, Amstelkring Museum, Amsterdam (url)
- Jan de Bray (1627–1697), 17 paintings : The Adoration of the Magi, Historisches Museum, Bamberg (url)
- Joseph de Bray (1630–1664), 1 painting : Still-Life in Praise of the Pickled Herring, Gemäldegalerie, Dresden (url)
- Salomon de Bray (1597–1664), 7 paintings : Jael, Deborah and Barak, Museum Catharijneconvent, Utrecht (url)
- John Leslie Breck (1860–1899), 2 paintings : Garden at Giverny, Terra Foundation for American Art, Chicago (url)
- Jan Frans van Bredael (1686–1750), 1 painting : Landscape, private collection (url)
- Bartholomeus Breenbergh (1598–1657), 8 paintings : Landscape with the Finding of Moses, Hallwylska Muséet, Stockholm (url)
- George Hendrik Breitner (1857–1923), 4 paintings : Bridge over the Singel near Paleisstraat in Amsterdam, Rijksmuseum, Amsterdam (url)
- Quirijn van Brekelenkam (1622–1670), 10 paintings : Confidential Conversation, Rijksmuseum, Amsterdam (url)
- Andrea del Brescianino (c. 1485 – c. 1545), 3 paintings : Venus and Two Cupids, Galleria Borghese, Rome (url)
- Domenico Bresolin (c. 1815 – c. 1899), 1 painting : Ruined House, Museo d'Arte Moderna, Ca' Pesaro, Venice (url)
- Jules Breton (1827–1906), 4 paintings : Erecting a Calvary, Musée des Beaux-Arts, Lille (url)
- Paul and Mattheus Brill (1554–1626), 19 paintings : Coastal Landscape, Wallraf-Richartz-Museum, Cologne (url)
- Philipp Hieronymus Brinckmann (1709–1760), 1 painting : Rocky Landscape, private collection (url)
- Francesco Brizio (c. 1574–1623), 1 painting : Madonna and Child with Sts Catherine and Francis, private collection (url)
- Jean Broc (1771–1850), 1 painting : The Death of Hyacinth, Musée Rupert de Chièvres, Poitiers (url)
- Károly Brocky (1807–1855), 7 paintings : Does He Love Me?, Magyar Nemzeti Galéria, Budapest (url)
- Sándor Brodszky (1819–1901), 3 paintings : View to the Lake Balaton (Storm), Magyar Nemzeti Galéria, Budapest (url)
- Richard Brompton (c. 1734–1783), 3 paintings : Portrait of Catherine II, The Hermitage, St. Petersburg (url)
- Jan Gerritsz van Bronckhorst (1603–1661), 4 paintings : Merry Company with a Violinist, The Hermitage, St. Petersburg (url)
- Johannes Jansz Bronckhorst (1627–1656), 1 painting : St Bartholomew, Liechtenstein Museum, Vienna (url)
- Bronzino (1503–1572), 55 paintings : Alessandro de' Medici, Galleria degli Uffizi, Florence (url)
- Charles Brooking (c. 1723–1759), 3 paintings : The Capture of a French Ship by Royal Family Privateers, private collection (url)
- Adriaen Brouwer (1605–1638), 17 paintings : A Boor Asleep, Wallace Collection, London (url)
- Ford Madox Brown (1821–1893), 2 paintings : The Last of England, City Art Gallery, Birmingham (url)
- Mather Brown (1761–1831), 5 paintings : John Howard, National Portrait Gallery, London (url)
- Patrick Henry Bruce (1859–1906), 1 painting : Landscape with Poppies, Art Gallery of Ontario, Toronto (url)
- Pieter Bruegel the Elder (1526–1569), 194 paintings : Landscape with the Fall of Icarus, Royal Museums of Fine Arts of Belgium, Brussels (url)
- Abraham Brueghel (1631–1690), 5 paintings : Fruit Still-Life, The Hermitage, St. Petersburg (url)
- Jan Brueghel the Elder (1568–1624), 58 paintings : Air (Optics), Musée du Louvre, Paris (url)
- Jan Brueghel the Younger (1601–1678), 7 paintings : Holy Family Framed with Flowers, The Hermitage, St. Petersburg (url)
- Pieter Brueghel the Younger (1564–1638), 25 paintings : Adoration of the Magi, Museo Correr, Venice (url)
- Domenico Brusasorci (1516–1567), 1 painting : Portrait of Pase Guarienti, Museo di Castelvecchio, Verona (url)
- Abraham de Bruyn (1538–1587), 9 paintings : Burgomaster Arnold von Brauweiler, Wallraf-Richartz-Museum, Cologne (url)
- Karl Pavlovich Bryullov (1799–1852), 6 paintings : Bathsheba, State Tretyakov Gallery, Moscow (url)
- Giuliano Bugiardini (1475–1554), 5 paintings : Holy Family with St John the Baptist, The Hermitage, St. Petersburg (url)
- Willem van den Bundel (1575–1655), 1 painting : Landscape, private collection (url)
- Dennis Miller Bunker (1861–1890), 1 painting : The Pool, Medfield, Museum of Fine Arts, Boston (url)
- Giovanni Buonconsiglio (c. 1465 – c. 1537), 3 paintings : Sts Benedict, Thecla, and Damian, Galleria dell'Accademia, Venice (url)
- Hendrick van der Burgh (1625–1664), 3 paintings : Woman with a Child Blowing Bubbles in a Garden, Kunsthaus, Zurich (url)
- Hans Burgkmair (1473–1540), 3 paintings : Crucifix with Mary, Mary Magdalen and St John the Evangelist, Alte Pinakothek, Munich (url)
- Heinrich Bürkel (1802–1869), 2 paintings : Graveyard of St. Peter's in Winter, Residenzgalerie, Salzburg (url)
- Edward Burne-Jones (1833–1898), 7 paintings : Princess Sabra (The King's Daughter), Musée d'Orsay, Paris (url)
- Friedrich Bury (1761–1823), 2 paintings : Countess Luise von Voss, Staatliche Museen, Berlin (url)
- Giovanni Battista Busiri (1698–1757), 2 paintings : Roman Landscape near to a Bridge, private collection (url)
- Ludovico Buti (c. 1555–1611), 1 painting : Optical Illusion with Portraits of Charles II and His Daughter Christine of Lorraine, Istituto e Museo di Storia della Scienza, Florence (url)
- Giovanni Maria Butteri (c. 1540 – c. 1606), 2 paintings : Madonna and Child Enthroned with Saints, Norton Museum of Art, West Palm Beach, Florida (url)
- Willem Pieterszoon Buytewech (1591–1624), 8 paintings : Banquet in the Open Air, Staatliche Museen, Berlin (url)

== C ==
- Alexandre Cabanel (1823–1889), 2 paintings : The Birth of Venus, Musée d'Orsay, Paris (url)
- Juan Martín Cabezalero (1633–1673), 1 painting : Assumption of the Virgin, Museo del Prado, Madrid (url)
- Vincenzo Cabianca (1827–1902), 1 painting : Tuscan Storytellers of the 14th century, Galleria dell'Arte Moderna, Palazzo Pitti, Florence (url)
- Orsola Maddalena Caccia (1596–1676), 2 paintings : Birth of the Virgin, Pinacoteca Malaspina, Pavia (url)
- Francesco Caccianiga (1700–1781), 1 painting : St Carlo Borromeo Tended by an Angel, private collection (url)
- Giuseppe Cades (1750–1799), 1 painting : The Meeting of Gautier, Count of Antwerp, and his Daughter, Violante, Art Institute, Chicago (url)
- Ippolito Caffi (1809–1866), 4 paintings : Bombardment of Marghera on the Night of May 24, 1849, Museo d'Arte Moderna, Ca' Pesaro, Venice (url)
- Margherita Caffi (c. 1650–1710), 2 paintings : Still-Life of Flowers in a Gilded Vase, private collection (url)
- Guido Cagnacci (1601–1682), 5 paintings : The Death of Cleopatra, Pinacoteca di Brera, Milan (url)
- Gustave Caillebotte (1848–1894), 22 paintings : Floor Scrapers, Musée d'Orsay, Paris (url)
- Francesco Cairo (1607–1665), 2 paintings : Herodias with the Head of Saint John the Baptist, Museum of Fine Arts, Boston (url)
- Eugenio Cajes (1575–1634), 2 paintings : The Adoration of the Magi, Szépmûvészeti Múzeum, Budapest (url)
- Alexandre Calame (1810–1864), 4 paintings : Landscape with Oaks, The Hermitage, St. Petersburg (url)
- Jan van Calcar (1499–1546), 1 painting : Portrait of a Young Bearded Gentleman, private collection (url)
- Benedetto Caliari (1538–1598), 2 paintings : Holy Family with Sts Catherine, Anne and John, The Hermitage, St. Petersburg (url)
- Carlo Caliari (1570–1596), 1 painting : Jesus Meeting Veronica, Basilica dei Santi Giovanni e Paolo, Venice (url)
- Antoine-François Callet (1741–1823), 2 paintings : Portrait of Louis XVI, Musée National du Château, Versailles (url)
- Abraham van Calraet (1642–1722), 3 paintings : Still-life with Peaches and Grapes, Mauritshuis, The Hague (url)
- Adolphe-Félix Cals (1810–1880), 3 paintings : Fisherman, Musée d'Orsay, Paris (url)
- Denis Calvaert (1540–1619), 2 paintings : The Holy Family with the Infant St John the Baptist in a Landscape, National Gallery of Scotland, Edinburgh (url)
- Andrea Camassei (1602–1649), 2 paintings : The Massacre of the Niobids, Galleria Nazionale d'Arte Antica, Rome (url)
- Luca Cambiasi (1527–1585), 4 paintings : Virgin with the Christ Child in Swaddling Clothes, Museo dell'Accademia Ligustica di Belle Arti, Genoa (url)
- Francisco Camilo (c. 1615–1671), 2 paintings : Adoration of the Magi, Museo de Bellas Artes, Bilbao (url)
- Michele Cammarano (1835–1920), 1 painting : Sloth and Work, Museo Nazionale di Capodimonte, Naples (url)
- Pedro de Campaña (1503–1580), 2 paintings : Altarpiece of the Purification, Cathedral, Seville (url)
- Jacob van Campen (1595–1657), 2 paintings : The Last Judgment, St. Joriskerk, Amersfoort (url)
- Antonio Campi (1523–1587), 2 paintings : The Martyrdom of St Lawrence, San Paolo Converso, Milan (url)
- Giulio Campi (1502–1572), 4 paintings : The Chess Players, Museo Civico, Turin (url)
- Vincenzo Campi (c. 1530 – 1591), 10 paintings : Fruit Seller, Pinacoteca di Brera, Milan (url)
- Pedro de Camprobín (1606–1674), 4 paintings : Vase of Flowers, Museo del Prado, Madrid (url)
- Vincenzo Camuccini (1771–1844), 1 painting : The Death of Julius Caesar, Museo Nazionale di Capodimonte, Naples (url)
- Bernardo Canal (1664–1744), 2 paintings : The Grand Canal with the Church of La Carità, private collection (url)
- Canaletto (1697–1768), 129 paintings : Rio dei Mendicanti, Museo del Settecento Veneziano, Ca' Rezzonico, Venice (url)
- Peter Candid (1548–1628), 2 paintings : Allegory of Vanity, private collection (url)
- Alonso Cano (1601–1667), 13 paintings : The Dead Christ Supported by an Angel, Museo del Prado, Madrid (url)
- Antonio Canova (1757–1822), 2 paintings : Portrait of Amadeo Svajer, Museo Correr, Venice (url)
- Simone Cantarini (1612–1648), 4 paintings : Holy Family, Museo del Prado, Madrid (url)
- Marie-Gabrielle Capet (1761–1818), 1 painting : Studio Scene, Neue Pinakothek, Munich (url)
- Francesco Cappella (1711–1774), 1 painting : Miracle of San Francesco da Paola, Museo Diocesano, Cortona (url)
- Jan van de Cappelle (1626–1679), 8 paintings : Calm, Wallraf-Richartz-Museum, Cologne (url)
- Domenico Capriolo (c. 1494–1528), 1 painting : Portrait of a Man, The Hermitage, St. Petersburg (url)
- Battistello Caracciolo (1578–1635), 5 paintings : Christ and Caiaphas, The Hermitage, St. Petersburg (url)
- Caravaggio (1571–1610), 181 paintings : Sick Bacchus, Galleria Borghese, Rome (url)
- Luis de Carbajal (1531 – c. 1621), 1 painting : Circumcision, The Hermitage, St. Petersburg (url)
- Bartolomeo Carducci (1560–1608), 3 paintings : Death of St Francis, Museu Nacional de Arte Antiga, Lisbon (url)
- Vincenzo Carducci (1576–1638), 2 paintings : Vision of St Francis of Assisi, Szépmûvészeti Múzeum, Budapest (url)
- Giovanni Cariani (c. 1485–1547), 9 paintings : Portrait of Two Young Men, Musée du Louvre, Paris (url)
- Luca Carlevarijs (1663–1730), 16 paintings : Seaport, Ca' Zenobio, Venice (url)
- Giovanni Andrea Carlone (1639–1697), 1 painting : Aurora (The Dawn), National Gallery of Slovenia, Ljubljana (url)
- Giovanni Battista Carlone (1603–1684), 1 painting : Virgin and Child in Glory with Saints, private collection (url)
- Fra Carnevale (c. 1425–1484), 1 painting : Heroic Figure against an Architectural Backdrop, Villa Cagnola, Gazzada (url)
- Antonio Carnicero (1748–1814), 2 paintings : Ascent of the Balloon in the Presence of Charles IV and his Court, Museo de Bellas Artes, Bilbao (url)
- Giovanni Carnovali (1804–1873), 1 painting : Salmacis and Hermaphroditus, private collection (url)
- Baldassare de Caro (1689 – c. 1750), 2 paintings : Still-Life with Turkey, Fruit and Flying Pigeon, Pinacoteca d'Errico, Matera (url)
- Carolus-Duran (1837–1917), 4 paintings : The Convalescent or The Casualty, Musée d'Orsay, Paris (url)
- Antoine Caron (1521–1599), 4 paintings : Augustus and the Sibyl, Musée du Louvre, Paris (url)
- Angelo Caroselli (1585–1652), 3 paintings : Rest on the Flight into Egypt, Galleria Nazionale d'Arte Antica, Rome (url)
- Giovanni Francesco Caroto (c. 1480 – c. 1555), 6 paintings : Portrait of a Young Benedictine, Museo di Castelvecchio, Verona (url)
- Vittore Carpaccio (1465–1527), 17 paintings : The Ambassadors Depart, Gallerie dell'Accademia, Venice (url)
- Girolamo da Carpi (1501–1557), 2 paintings : The Rape of Ganymede, Gemäldegalerie, Dresden (url)
- Giulio Carpioni (1613–1678), 4 paintings : Bacchanal, Museo Thyssen-Bornemisza, Madrid (url)
- Agostino Carracci (1557–1602), 4 paintings : Hairy Harry, Mad Peter and Tiny Amon, Museo Nazionale di Capodimonte, Naples (url)
- Annibale Carracci (1560–1609), 48 paintings : Assumption of the Virgin, Museo del Prado, Madrid (url)
- Antonio Marziale Carracci (c. 1583–1618), 3 paintings : Landscape with Bathers, Museum of Fine Arts, Boston (url)
- Ludovico Carracci (1555–1619), 11 paintings : Bargellini Madonna, Pinacoteca Nazionale, Bologna (url)
- Juan Carreño de Miranda (1614–1685), 13 paintings : Assumption of the Virgin, Museo de Bellas Artes, Bilbao (url)
- Eugène Carrière (1849–1906), 1 painting : The Sick Child, Musée d'Orsay, Paris (url)
- Carl Gustav Carus (1789–1869), 5 paintings : View of the Colosseum by Night, The Hermitage, St. Petersburg (url)
- Andrea Casali (1705–1764), 2 paintings : Portrait of Sir Charles Frederick, Ashmolean Museum, Oxford (url)
- Ramon Casas i Carbó (1866–1932), 3 paintings : Out of Doors, Museu d'Art Contemporani, Barcelona (url)
- Valore Casini (1590–1660), 3 paintings : Portrait of Leo X, Museo Storico della Caccia e del Territorio, Cerreto Guidi (url)
- Giovanni Agostino Cassana (1658–1720), 1 painting : Two Rams and a Goat, The Hermitage, St. Petersburg (url)
- Niccolò Cassana (1659–1713), 3 paintings : Bacchanalian Scene, The Hermitage, St. Petersburg (url)
- Mary Cassatt (1844–1926), 23 paintings : On the Balcony, Museum of Art, Philadelphia (url)
- Amos Cassioli (1832–1891), 1 painting : The Battle of Legnano, Galleria dell'Arte Moderna, Palazzo Pitti, Florence (url)
- Pieter Casteels III (1684–1749), 9 paintings : Domestic Birds in Park, Yale Center for British Art, New Haven (url)
- Manuel Castellano (1826–1880), 2 paintings : Horses in a Courtyard by the Bullring before the Bullfight, Madrid, Museo del Prado, Madrid (url)
- Bernardino Castelli (1750–1810), 1 painting : Portrait of the Nobleman Francesco Falier, Museo del Settecento Veneziano, Ca' Rezzonico, Venice (url)
- Valerio Castello (1624–1659), 6 paintings : The Miracle of the Roses, The Hermitage, St. Petersburg (url)
- Vicente Castelló (c. 1588 – c. 1636), 1 painting : The Martyrdom of St Catherine of Alexandria, Museo de Bellas Artes, Bilbao (url)
- Giovanni Benedetto Castiglione (1609–1664), 11 paintings : The Adoration of the Shepherds, Musée du Louvre, Paris (url)
- Giuseppe Castiglione (1829–1908) (1829–1908), 2 paintings : View of the Grand Salon Carré in the Louvre, Musée du Louvre, Paris (url)
- Agustín del Castillo (1616–1668), 3 paintings : Joseph Explains the Dream of the Pharaoh, Museo del Prado, Madrid (url)
- Juan del Castillo (c. 1590 – c. 1657), 1 painting : Visitation, The Hermitage, St. Petersburg (url)
- Franz Ludwig Catel (1778–1856), 4 paintings : View of Ariccia with the Sea in the Background, Neue Pinakothek, Munich (url)
- Vincenzo Catena (c. 1470–1531), 7 paintings : Santa Cristina Altarpiece, Santa Maria Materdomini, Venice (url)
- George Catlin (1796–1872), 1 painting : The Last Race, Mandan O-Kee-Pa Ceremony, National Museum of American Art, Washington (url)
- Louis de Caullery (1580–1621), 1 painting : A View of the Campidoglio, Rome, private collection (url)
- Bernardo Cavallino (1616–1656), 9 paintings : The Ecstasy of St Cecilia, Museo Nazionale di Capodimonte, Naples (url)
- Mirabello Cavalori (1535–1572), 2 paintings : Wool Factory, Palazzo Vecchio, Florence (url)
- Bartolomeo Cavarozzi (c. 1590–1625), 2 paintings : St Ursula and Her Companions with Pope Ciriacus and St Catherine of Alexandria, Basilica di San Marco, Rome (url)
- Paolo Moranda Cavazzola (c. 1486–1522), 1 painting : Warrior with Equerry, Galleria degli Uffizi, Florence (url)
- Pierre-Jacques Cazes (1676–1754), 1 painting : The Swing, Musée du Louvre, Paris (url)
- Cecco Bravo (1607–1661), 1 painting : Christ Supported by Two Angels, private collection (url)
- Cecco del Caravaggio (fl. 1610s), 3 paintings : The Flute Player, Ashmolean Museum, Oxford (url)
- Andrea Celesti (1637–1712), 5 paintings : Feast of Belshazzar, The Hermitage, St. Petersburg (url)
- Cenni di Francesco di Ser Cenni (1369–1415), 1 painting : Madonna and Child, private collection (url)
- Carlo Ceresa (1609–1670), 3 paintings : Portrait of a Friar, Accademia Carrara, Bergamo (url)
- Mateo Cerezo (1637–1666), 4 paintings : The Assumption of the Virgin, Museo del Prado, Madrid (url)
- Stefano Cernotto (fl.1530–1542), 1 painting : Finding of Moses, Akademie der bildenden Künste, Vienna (url)
- Michelangelo Cerquozzi (1602–1660), 3 paintings : Figures in a Tree-lined Avenue, Galleria Nazionale d'Arte Antica, Rome (url)
- Giovanni Domenico Cerrini (1609–1681), 2 paintings : Allegory of Human Fragility, Museo Bardini, Florence (url)
- Giacomo Ceruti (1698–1767), 19 paintings : Three Beggars, Fundación Colección Thyssen-Bornemisza, Pedralbes (url)
- Federico Cervelli (1638–1698), 1 painting : Lot and His Daughters, private collection (url)
- Cesare da Sesto (1477–1523), 4 paintings : Holy Family with St Catherine, The Hermitage, St. Petersburg (url)
- Giuseppe Cesari (1568–1640), 19 paintings : The Betrayal of Christ, Galleria Borghese, Rome (url)
- Paul Cézanne (1839–1906), 101 paintings : Spring, Summer, Winter, Autumn, Petit Palais, Paris (url)
- Mason Chamberlin (1727–1787), 2 paintings : Portrait of a Gentleman with a Boy, private collection (url)
- Jean Baptiste de Champaigne (1631–1680), 1 painting : The Martyrdom of St Lawrence, National Gallery of Art, Washington (url)
- Philippe de Champaigne (1602–1673), 24 paintings : The Annunciation, Wallace Collection, London (url)
- John Westbrooke Chandler (1764–1807), 2 paintings : Four Children at Play as Macbeth and the Three Witches, private collection (url)
- Jean-Baptiste-Siméon Chardin (1699–1779), 54 paintings : The Attributes of the Arts with a Bust of Mercury, Pushkin Museum, Moscow (url)
- James Charles (1851–1906), 1 painting : The Picnic, Museum and Art Gallery, Warrington (url)
- Nicolas Toussaint Charlet (1792–1845), 1 painting : Soldier and Boys, The Hermitage, St. Petersburg (url)
- Enguerrand Charonton (c. 1410–1461), 4 paintings : The Coronation of the Virgin, Musée de l'Hospice, Villeneuve-les-Avignon (url)
- Eugène Charpentier (1767–1849), 1 painting : Melancholy, Musée de Picardie, Amiens (url)
- Jean-Baptiste Charpentier the Elder (1728–1806), 3 paintings : The Family of the Duc de Penthièvre ("La Tasse de Chocolat"), Musée National du Château, Versailles (url)
- William Merritt Chase (1849–1916), 4 paintings : The Open Air Breakfast, Toledo Museum of Art, Toledo, Ohio (url)
- Théodore Chassériau (1819–1856), 10 paintings : Andromeda and the Nereids, Musée du Louvre, Paris (url)
- Pierre-Athanase Chauvin (1774–1832), 2 paintings : Italian Landscape, The Hermitage, St. Petersburg (url)
- Grigory Chernetsov (1802–1865), 1 painting : The Gallery of 1812 in the Winter Palace, The Hermitage, St. Petersburg (url)
- Vincenzo Chilone (1758–1839), 1 painting : The Return of the Horses of San Marco, private collection (url)
- Daniel Chodowiecki (1726–1801), 2 paintings : The Lying-in Room (1), Staatliche Museen, Berlin (url)
- Petrus Christus (1415–1476), 10 paintings : A Donator, National Gallery of Art, Washington (url)
- Frederic Edwin Church (1826–1900), 4 paintings : Autumn, Museo Thyssen-Bornemisza, Madrid (url)
- Guglielmo Ciardi (1842–1917), 3 paintings : Harvest, Galleria Nazionale d'Arte Moderna e Contemporanea, Rome (url)
- Carlo Cignani (1628–1719), 3 paintings : Joseph and Potiphar's Wife, Gemäldegalerie, Dresden (url)
- Giambettino Cignaroli (1706–1770), 2 paintings : The Death of Socrates, Szépmûvészeti Múzeum, Budapest (url)
- Cigoli (1559–1613), 8 paintings : Ecce Homo, Galleria Palatina (Palazzo Pitti), Florence (url)
- Cima da Conegliano (c. 1459–1517/18), 13 paintings : St John the Baptist with Saints, Madonna dell'Orto, Venice (url)
- Giovanni Battista Cimaroli (1687–1771), 1 painting : View of the Canal Grande, private collection (url)
- Romulo Cincinato (c. 1502–1593), 1 painting : The Martyrdom of St Maurice, Monasterio de San Lorenzo, El Escorial (url)
- Giacomo Francesco Cipper (1664–1736), 3 paintings : The Cobbler, The Hermitage, St. Petersburg (url)
- Antonio Ciseri (1821–1891), 1 painting : Ecce Homo, Galleria dell'Arte Moderna, Palazzo Pitti, Florence (url)
- Pierfrancesco Cittadini (1616–1681), 4 paintings : Still-Life with Fruit and Sweets, Galleria Nazionale d'Arte Antica, Trieste (url)
- Antoon Claeissens (1536–1613), 4 paintings : Banquet, Groeninge Museum, Bruges (url)
- Pieter Claeissens the Younger (before 1536–1623), 1 painting : Allegory of the 1577 Peace in the Low Countries, Groeninge Museum, Bruges (url)
- Pieter Claesz (1597–1660), 18 paintings : Breakfast-piece, Pushkin Museum, Moscow (url)
- Claude Lorrain (1604–1682), 49 paintings : Landscape with Merchants, National Gallery of Art, Washington (url)
- Emile Claus (1849–1924), 3 paintings : Dew, Galleria Nazionale d'Arte Moderna e Contemporanea, Rome (url)
- George Clausen (1852–1944), 1 painting : The Mowers, Usher Gallery, London (url)
- Hendrick de Clerck (1570–1630), 1 painting : The Nuptials of Thetis and Peleus, Musée du Louvre, Paris (url)
- Cornelius van Cleve (1520–1604), 1 painting : Holy Family, Groeninge Museum, Bruges (url)
- Hendrick Van Cleve (c. 1480 – c1519), 1 painting : The Building of the Temple of Artemis at Ephesus, private collection (url)
- Joos van Cleve (1485–1541), 17 paintings : Adoration of the Magi, Gemäldegalerie, Dresden (url)
- Martin Van Cleve (1527–1581), 1 painting : Christ on the Road to Calvary, private collection (url)
- John Cleveley the Elder (c. 1712–1777), 3 paintings : The Royal Caroline, National Maritime Museum, Greenwich (url)
- John Cleveley the Younger (1747–1786), 2 paintings : The Resolution and Discovery off Hawaii, National Maritime Museum, Greenwich (url)
- James Goodwyn Clonney (1812–1867), 1 painting : Fishing Party on Long Island Sound off New Rochelle, Museo Thyssen-Bornemisza, Madrid (url)
- John Closterman (1660–1711), 1 painting : Portrait of Guilford Killigrew, When a Boy, private collection (url)
- François Clouet (c. 1510–1572), 11 paintings : Portrait of King Charles IX of France, Kunsthistorisches Museum, Vienna (url)
- Jean Clouet (1480–1541), 4 paintings : The Dauphin François, Son of François I, Koninklijk Museum voor Schone Kunsten, Antwerp (url)
- Jan Wellens de Cock (1480–1527), 2 paintings : Temptation of St Anthony, Museo Thyssen-Bornemisza, Madrid (url)
- Paul de Cock (1724–1801), 1 painting : Landscape with Roman Ruins, Groeninge Museum, Bruges (url)
- Viviano Codazzi (1604–1670), 3 paintings : Architectural View, Galleria degli Uffizi, Florence (url)
- Pieter Codde (1599–1678), 12 paintings : Actors' Changing Room, Staatliche Museen, Berlin (url)
- Pieter Coecke van Aelst (1502–1550), 8 paintings : Agony in the Garden, The Hermitage, St. Petersburg (url)
- Claudio Coello (1642–1693), 9 paintings : The Triumph of St Augustine, Museo del Prado, Madrid (url)
- Jan Coessaet (1550–1587), 2 paintings : Opening Session of the Parliament of Burgundy, City Hall, Mechelen (url)
- Thomas Cole (1801–1848), 9 paintings : The Ages of Life: Youth, National Gallery of Art, Washington (url)
- Giovanni Coli (1636–1681), 1 painting : The Triumph of Wisdom, Convent of San Giorgio Maggiore, Venice (url)
- Alexandre-Marie Colin (1798–1873), 2 paintings : La Belle Orientale, private collection (url)
- Francisco Collantes (1599–1656), 4 paintings : The Burning Bush, Musée du Louvre, Paris (url)
- Evert Collier (1642–1708), 9 paintings : Vanitas Still-Life, Metropolitan Museum of Art, New York (url)
- Charles Allston Collins (c. 1680–1744), 1 painting : Exotic Pheasants and Other Birds, private collection (url)
- Nicolas Colombel (1644–1717), 2 paintings : Christ Healing the Blind, Art Museum, Saint Louis (url)
- Andrea Commodi (1560–1638), 1 painting : Young Woman in the Kitchen, private collection (url)
- Jan ten Compe (1713–1761), 2 paintings : Haarlem: View of the Town Hall, private collection (url)
- Sebastiano Conca (1680–1764), 4 paintings : Alexander the Great in the Temple of Jerusalem, Museo del Prado, Madrid (url)
- Gillis Coignet (1542–1599), 1 painting : Pierson La Hues, Koninklijk Museum voor Schone Kunsten, Antwerp (url)
- Gillis van Coninxloo (1544–1606), 3 paintings : Forest Landscape, Liechtenstein Museum, Vienna (url)
- John Constable (1776–1837), 26 paintings : Boat-building near Flatford Mill, Victoria and Albert Museum, London (url)
- Jacopino del Conte (c. 1515–1598), 2 paintings : Portrait of Michelangelo, Metropolitan Museum of Art, New York (url)
- Domenico Conti (1742–1817), 1 painting : Portrait of Antonio Canova in His Studio, private collection (url)
- Francesco Conti (1681–1760), 5 paintings : Crucifixion, San Lorenzo, Florence (url)
- Edward William Cooke (1811–1880), 3 paintings : North Sea Breeze on Dutch Coast, National Maritime Museum, Greenwich (url)
- Abraham Cooper (1787–1868), 2 paintings : Portrait of Daniel Haigh, private collection (url)
- Adriaen Coorte (1660–1707), 2 paintings : Still-Life with Asparagus, Rijksmuseum, Amsterdam (url)
- John Singleton Copley (1738–1815), 7 paintings : Portrait of Rebecca Boylston, Museum of Fine Arts, Boston (url)
- Gonzales Coques (1614–1683), 2 paintings : Family Portrait, Szépmûvészeti Múzeum, Budapest (url)
- Lovis Corinth (1858–1925), 14 paintings : Othello, the Negro, Neue Galerie der Stadt Linz, Wolfgang-Gurlitt-Museum, Linz (url)
- Fernand Cormon (1845–1924), 3 paintings : Cain, Musée d'Orsay, Paris (url)
- Corneille de Lyon (1505–1575), 5 paintings : Portrait of Louise de Rieux, Musée du Louvre, Paris (url)
- Michel Corneille the Younger (1642–1708), 1 painting : Esau and Jacob, Musée des Beaux-Arts, Orléans (url)
- Cornelis van Haarlem (1562–1637), 19 paintings : The Wedding of Peleus and Thetis, Frans Halsmuseum, Haarlem (url)
- Jacob Cornelisz van Oostsanen (1472–1533), 10 paintings : Christ Appearing to Mary Magdalen as a Gardener, Staatliche Museen, Kassel (url)
- Peter Cornelius (1783–1867), 1 painting : The Three Marys at the Tomb, Neue Pinakothek, Munich (url)
- Jean-Baptiste-Camille Corot (1796–1875), 29 paintings : The Cathedral of Chartres, Musée du Louvre, Paris (url)
- Antonio da Correggio (1489–1534), 28 paintings : The Adoration of the Child, Galleria degli Uffizi, Florence (url)
- Gabriel de la Corte (1648–1694), 6 paintings : Vase of Flowers, Museo del Prado, Madrid (url)
- Juan de la Corte (c. 1590–1662), 3 paintings : Battle, The Hermitage, St. Petersburg (url)
- Francesco del Cossa (c. 1435 – c. 1477), 8 paintings : Griffoni Polyptych: St Vincent Ferrer, National Gallery, London (url)
- Jan Cossiers (1600–1670), 1 painting : Fortune Teller, The Hermitage, St. Petersburg (url)
- Lorenzo Costa (1460–1535), 15 paintings : Adoration of the Magi, Pinacoteca di Brera, Milan (url)
- Lorenzo Costa the Younger (1537–1583), 1 painting : The Martyrdom of St Hadrian, Church of St Barbara, Mantua (url)
- Jean Cotelle (1642–1708), 5 paintings : View of the Colonnade at Versailles, Galerie du Grand Trianon, Versailles (url)
- Colijn de Coter (1450–1532), 2 paintings : The Adoration of the Magi, Museum voor Schone Kunsten, Ghent (url)
- Francis Cotes (1726–1770), 3 paintings : Portrait of Martha Seymer as Modesty, private collection (url)
- Auguste Couder (1790–1873), 1 painting : Death of Masaccio, The Hermitage, St. Petersburg (url)
- Gustave Courbet (1819–1877), 75 paintings : After Dinner at Ornans, Musée des Beaux-Arts, Lille (url)
- Joseph-Désiré Court (1797–1865), 3 paintings : Half-length Woman Lying on a Couch, Musée Fabre, Montpellier (url)
- Guillaume Courtois (1628–1679), 2 paintings : Martyrdom of St Andrew, private collection (url)
- Jacques Courtois (1621–1676), 5 paintings : The Battle of Mongiovino, Galleria degli Uffizi, Florence (url)
- Jean Cousin the Elder (1490–1570), 2 paintings : Charity, Musée Fabre, Montpellier (url)
- Jean Cousin the Younger (1522–1594), 1 painting : Last Judgment, Musée du Louvre, Paris (url)
- Pierre Coustain (1453–1487), 2 paintings : Coat-of-Arms of Anthony of Burgundy, Sint-Salvatorskerk, Bruges (url)
- Thomas Couture (1815–1879), 5 paintings : Romans of the Decadence, Musée d'Orsay, Paris (url)
- Christiaen van Couwenbergh (1604–1667), 5 paintings : Three Young White Men and a Black Woman, Musée des Beaux-Arts, Strasbourg (url)
- Jan Anthonie Coxie (1660–1720), 1 painting : Portrait of a Family, private collection (url)
- Michiel Coxie (1499–1592), 7 paintings : Annunciation, The Hermitage, St. Petersburg (url)
- Raphael Coxie (1540–1616), 1 painting : Last Judgment, Museum voor Schone Kunsten, Ghent (url)
- Antoine Coypel (1661–1722), 4 paintings : Democritus, Musée du Louvre, Paris (url)
- Charles-Antoine Coypel (1694–1752), 3 paintings : Fury of Achilles, The Hermitage, St. Petersburg (url)
- Noël-Nicolas Coypel (1690–1734), 5 paintings : Madame de Bourbon-Conti, Ringling Museum of Art, Sarasota (url)
- John Robert Cozens (1752–1797), 1 painting : Entrance to the Valley of Grande Chartreuse in Dauphiné, Ashmolean Museum, Oxford (url)
- Joos van Craesbeeck (1605-ca1659), 3 paintings : Drunkard, The Hermitage, St. Petersburg (url)
- Hans Cranach (1513–1537), 2 paintings : Portrait of a Prince, Wallraf-Richartz-Museum, Cologne (url)
- Lucas Cranach the Elder (1472–1553), 179 paintings : Triptych with the Holy Kinship, Städelsches Kunstinstitut, Frankfurt (url)
- Lucas Cranach the Younger (1515–1586), 14 paintings : Christ and the Woman Taken in Adultery, The Hermitage, St. Petersburg (url)
- Caspar de Crayer (1582–1669), 5 paintings : Alexander and Diogenes, Wallraf-Richartz-Museum, Cologne (url)
- Daniele Crespi (c. 1590–1630), 6 paintings : The Entombment, Szépmûvészeti Múzeum, Budapest (url)
- Giovanni Battista Crespi (1565–1632), 5 paintings : St Carlo Borromeo Erecting Crosses at the Gates of Milan (detail), Cathedral, Milan (url)
- Giuseppe Crespi (1665–1747), 23 paintings : Bookshelves, Civico Museo Bibliografico Musicale, Bologna (url)
- Luigi Crespi (1708–1779), 1 painting : Elisabetta Cellesi, Staatliche Museen, Berlin (url)
- Donato Creti (1671–1749), 3 paintings : Achilles Handing over to Chiron, Palazzo d'Accursio, Bologna (url)
- Carlo Crivelli (1430/35–1495), 5 paintings : Annunciation with St Emidius, National Gallery, London (url)
- Vittorio Crivelli (c. 1444–1501 or later), 1 painting : St Jerome in the Desert, private collection (url)
- Jasper Francis Cropsey (1823–1900), 2 paintings : Greenwood Lake, Museo Thyssen-Bornemisza, Madrid (url)
- Giovanni Battista Crosato (c. 1685–1758), 1 painting : The Fortune Teller, private collection (url)
- Henri-Edmond Cross (1856–1910), 8 paintings : Cypresses at Cagnes, Musée d'Orsay, Paris (url)
- Diego de la Cruz (fl. 1482–1500), 1 painting : Pietà, Museo del Prado, Madrid (url)
- Tivadar Csontváry Kosztka (1853–1919), 18 paintings : Old Woman Peeling Apple, Janus Pannonius Múzeum, Pécs (url)
- Maurice Galbraith Cullen (1866–1934), 1 painting : Winter at Moret, Art Gallery of Ontario, Toronto (url)
- Francesco Curradi (1570–1661), 1 painting : Narcissus, Galleria Palatina (Palazzo Pitti), Florence (url)
- Frans Cuyck van Myerop (c. 1640–1689), 1 painting : Still-Life with Fowl, Groeninge Museum, Bruges (url)
- Abraham van Cuylenborch (1620–1658), 4 paintings : Bacchus and Nymphs in Landscape, Metropolitan Museum of Art, New York (url)
- Aelbert Cuyp (1620–1691), 29 paintings : The Avenue at Meerdervoort, Wallace Collection, London (url)
- Benjamin Gerritsz Cuyp (1612–1652), 4 paintings : The Angel Is Opening Christ's Tomb, Szépmûvészeti Múzeum, Budapest (url)
- Jacob Gerritsz. Cuyp (1594–1652), 3 paintings : Portrait of a Child, Städelsches Kunstinstitut, Frankfurt (url)

== D ==
- Jan Frans van Dael (1764–1840), 2 paintings : Basket of Fruit, The Hermitage, St. Petersburg (url)
- Moritz Daffinger (1790–1849), 1 painting : Portrait of the Archduchess Maria Theresia, Residenzgalerie, Salzburg (url)
- Johan Christian Dahl (1788–1857), 7 paintings : Morning after a Stormy Night, Neue Pinakothek, Munich (url)
- Michael Dahl (c. 1659–1743), 1 painting : Portrait of a Woman, The Hermitage, St. Petersburg (url)
- Cornelis van Dalem (1530–1576), 1 painting : Farmyard with a Beggar, Musée du Louvre, Paris (url)
- Dirck Dalens the Elder (1600–1676), 3 paintings : Netherlandish Harbour with Fishing Boats, private collection (url)
- Dirk Dalens (1659–1687), 2 paintings : River Landscape, private collection (url)
- Dirk Dalens III (1688–1753), 3 paintings : Frozen River Landscape, private collection (url)
- Francis Danby (1793–1861), 2 paintings : Scene from the Apocalypse, private collection (url)
- Nathaniel Dance-Holland (1735–1811), 4 paintings : Self-Portrait, National Portrait Gallery, London (url)
- Cesare Dandini (1596–1656), 4 paintings : Holy Family, The Hermitage, St. Petersburg (url)
- Pietro Dandini (1646–1712), 1 painting : Solomon and the Queen of Sheba, private collection (url)
- Michel-François Dandré-Bardon (1700–1783), 1 painting : The Adoration of the Skulls, National Gallery of Art, Washington (url)
- Bartholomew Dandridge (1691 – c. 1754), 1 painting : Portrait of a Girl, private collection (url)
- Josef Danhauser (1805–1845), 4 paintings : The Widow's Offering, Residenzgalerie, Salzburg (url)
- Daniele da Volterra (1509–1566), 2 paintings : The Massacre of the Innocents, Galleria degli Uffizi, Florence (url)
- Henri-Pierre Danloux (1753–1809), 2 paintings : Portrait of the Artist's Wife and Son, private collection (url)
- Jacques Daret (1404–1470), 5 paintings : Altarpiece of the Virgin, Staatliche Museen, Berlin (url)
- Charles-François Daubigny (1817–1878), 7 paintings : The Barges, Musée du Louvre, Paris (url)
- Honoré Daumier (1808–1879), 16 paintings : The Republic, Musée d'Orsay, Paris (url)
- Gerard David (1460–1523), 48 paintings : Adoration of the Magi, Royal Museums of Fine Arts of Belgium, Brussels (url)
- Jacques-Louis David (1748–1825), 68 paintings : Portrait of Marie-Françoise Buron, Musée National des Beaux-Arts, Algiers (url)
- George Dawe (1781–1829), 7 paintings : Portrait of Dmitry V. Golitsyn, The Hermitage, St. Petersburg (url)
- Lajos Deák Ébner (1850–1934), 5 paintings : Riverside, Magyar Nemzeti Galéria, Budapest (url)
- Alexandre-Gabriel Decamps (1803–1860), 8 paintings : The Defeat of the Cimbri, Musée du Louvre, Paris (url)
- Cornelis Gerritsz Decker (1618–1678), 2 paintings : Cottage among Trees on Bank of Stream, National Gallery, London (url)
- Edgar Degas (1834–1917), 63 paintings : Jephthah's Daughter, Smith College Museum of Art, Northampton (url)
- William Degouve de Nuncques (1867–1935), 1 painting : The Blind House or The Pink House, Rijksmuseum Kröller-Müller, Otterlo (url)
- Eugène Delacroix (1798–1863), 75 paintings : Mlle Rose, Musée du Louvre, Paris (url)
- Solomon Delane (1727–1812), 3 paintings : A View near Tivoli at Dawn, private collection (url)
- Henri-Horace Roland De La Porte (c. 1724 – 1793), 2 paintings : Still-Life with a Carafe of Barley Wine, Musée du Louvre, Paris (url)
- Paul Delaroche (1797–1856), 10 paintings : The Death of Elizabeth I, Queen of England, Musée du Louvre, Paris (url)
- Henri Delavallée (1862–1943), 1 painting : Farmyard, private collection (url)
- Dirk van Delen (1605–1671), 7 paintings : Conversation outside a Castle, Statens Museum for Kunst, Copenhagen (url)
- Cornelis Jacobsz Delff (1570–1643), 2 paintings : Kitchen Still-Life, Institute of Arts, Minneapolis (url)
- Jacob Willemsz Delff (1550–1601), 2 paintings : Portrait of the Artist and His Family, Rijksmuseum, Amsterdam (url)
- Jacob Willemsz Delff the Younger (1619–1661), 2 paintings : Portrait of a Bearded Man, private collection (url)
- Hippolyte-Camille Delpy (1824–1910), 2 paintings : The Pont Neuf and the Quai des Orfèvres, from the Place du Pont Neuf, private collection (url)
- Simon Denis (1755–1813), 1 painting : View of Monticelli, near Tivoli, private collection (url)
- Ludwig Deppe (1828–1890), 1 painting : Houses at a Millrace, Schloss Charlottenburg, Berlin (url)
- Claude Deruet (1588–1662), 2 paintings : Road to Calvary, National Gallery of Art, Washington (url)
- Marcellin Desboutin (1823–1902), 1 painting : Portrait of Jean-Baptiste Faure, private collection (url)
- Jean-Baptiste-Henri Deshays (1729–1765), 2 paintings : The Flight into Egypt, Musée du Louvre, Paris (url)
- Alexandre-François Desportes (1661–1743), 6 paintings : Self-Portrait as a Huntsman, Musée du Louvre, Paris (url)
- Édouard Detaille (1848–1912), 1 painting : The Dream, Musée d'Orsay, Paris (url)
- Eugène Devéria (1808–1865), 1 painting : Portrait of Laurence Davidson and His Three Sons, private collection (url)
- Anthony Devis (1729–1816), 1 painting : Tabley House, private collection (url)
- Arthur William Devis (1712–1787), 5 paintings : Richard Bull and Mary Bennett, Metropolitan Museum of Art, New York (url)
- Arthur William Devis (1762–1822), 1 painting : Gwyllym Lloyd Wardle, National Portrait Gallery, London (url)
- Thomas Anthony Devis (1757–1810), 1 painting : Admiral Michael Clements, Harris Museum and Art Gallery, Preston (url)
- Wynford Dewhurst (1864–1941), 1 painting : Luncheon on the Grass (Picnic), City Art Gallery, Manchester (url)
- Benedetto Diana (c. 1460–1525), 1 painting : Pietà, Museo Correr, Venice (url)
- Giacinto Diana (1731–1804), 1 painting : Apotheosis of the Heroes of Antiquity, private collection (url)
- Narcisse Virgilio Díaz (1807–1876), 3 paintings : The Forest in Fontainebleau, Musée des Beaux-Arts, Bordeaux (url)
- Diego Valentín Díaz (1586–1680), 2 paintings : Vase of Flowers, Museo Diocesano y Catedralicio, Valladolid (url)
- Christian Wilhelm Ernst Dietrich (1712–1774), 4 paintings : The Sacrifice of Isaac, Szépmûvészeti Múzeum, Budapest (url)
- Abraham van Dijck (1635–1680), 1 painting : Presentation in the Temple, private collection (url)
- Floris van Dyck (1575–1651), 5 paintings : Laid Table with Cheeses and Fruit, Rijksmuseum, Amsterdam (url)
- Adolf Alexander Dillens (1821–1877), 1 painting : Capture of Joan of Arc, The Hermitage, St. Petersburg (url)
- Hendrick Joseph Dillens (1812–1872), 1 painting : Archer the Winner, The Hermitage, St. Petersburg (url)
- Johann Georg von Dillis (1759–1841), 1 painting : Grottaferrata near Rome, Neue Pinakothek, Munich (url)
- Antonio Diziani (1737–1797), 4 paintings : The Sala del Maggior Consiglio, Doge's Palace, Staatliche Museen, Berlin (url)
- Gaspare Diziani (1689–1767), 5 paintings : Adoration of the Magi, Szépmûvészeti Múzeum, Budapest (url)
- Giovanni Do (c. 1617–1656), 1 painting : The Painter's Studio, private collection (url)
- William Dobson (1610–1646), 5 paintings : The Painter with Sir Charles Cottrell and Sir Balthasar Gerbier, Albury Park, Guildford, England (url)
- Carlo Dolci (1616–1686), 14 paintings : Portrait of Ainolfo de' Bardi, Galleria Palatina (Palazzo Pitti), Florence (url)
- Domenichino (1581–1641), 26 paintings : Adam and Eve, Musée des Beaux-Arts, Grenoble (url)
- Domenico di Michelino (1417–1491), 3 paintings : Dante and the Three Kingdoms, Museo dell'Opera del Duomo, Florence (url)
- János Donát (1744–1830), 4 paintings : Portrait of János Bihari, Composer and Gipsy Virtuoso, Historical Picture Gallery, Hungarian National Museum, Budapest (url)
- Franciscus Joseph Octave van der Donckt (1757–1813), 1 painting : Portrait of Sylvie de la Rue, Groeninge Museum, Bruges (url)
- Gustave Doré (1832–1883), 1 painting : Gorge, private collection (url)
- István Dorffmaister, the Elder (1729–1797), 5 paintings : Béla III Founding the Cistercian Monastery at Szentgotthárd in 1183, Magyar Nemzeti Galéria, Budapest (url)
- Joseph Dorffmeister (1764–1807), 1 painting : Phidias Chiselling the Bust of Zeus, Akademie der bildenden Künste, Vienna (url)
- Louis Dorigny (1658–1746), 1 painting : Galatea, private collection (url)
- Michel Dorigny (1617–1663), 1 painting : Pan and Syrinx, Musée du Louvre, Paris (url)
- Battista Dossi (c. 1490–1548), 2 paintings : Allegory of Dawn, Gemäldegalerie, Dresden (url)
- Dosso Dossi (1469–1542), 20 paintings : Aeneas and Achates on the Libyan Coast, National Gallery of Art, Washington (url)
- Gerrit Dou (1613–1675), 38 paintings : Woman Peeling Carrot, Staatliches Museum, Schwerin (url)
- Gerard Douffet (1594–1660), 1 painting : Taking of Christ with the Malchus Episode, Museum of Fine Arts, Boston (url)
- Jan Frans van Douven (1656–1727), 2 paintings : Electress Palatine Dancing with Her Husband, Galleria Palatina (Palazzo Pitti), Florence (url)
- Gabriel-François Doyen (1726–1806), 1 painting : The Miracle of The Fervent, Saint-Roch, Paris (url)
- Johann Baptist Drechsler (1756–1811), 1 painting : Still-Life with Flowers, Fruit and Birds in the Open, Akademie der bildenden Künste, Vienna (url)
- Martin Drolling (1752–1817), 7 paintings : Interior of a Kitchen, Musée du Louvre, Paris (url)
- Joost Cornelisz Droochsloot (1586–1666), 10 paintings : Self-Portrait in a Landscape, The Hermitage, St. Petersburg (url)
- Willem Drost (1633–1659), 5 paintings : The Sibyl, Metropolitan Museum of Art, New York (url)
- François-Hubert Drouais (1727–1775), 5 paintings : Jeanne Bécu, Comtesse du Barry, National Gallery of Art, Washington (url)
- Jean-Germain Drouais (1763–1788), 2 paintings : The Woman of Canaan at the Feet of Christ, Musée du Louvre, Paris (url)
- Hendrick Dubbels (1621–1707), 2 paintings : River Landscape with a Vessel Saluting, private collection (url)
- Alexandre-Jean Dubois-Drahonet (1791–1834), 3 paintings : Portraits of the Princess Marie de Valois, Museo Nazionale di Capodimonte, Naples (url)
- Albert Dubois-Pillet (1846–1890), 3 paintings : The Marne at Dawn, Musée d'Orsay, Paris (url)
- Toussaint Dubreuil (1561–1602), 2 paintings : Hyanthe and Clymene Offering a Sacrifice to Venus, Musée du Louvre, Paris (url)
- Claude-Marie Dubufe (1790–1864), 5 paintings : The Dubufe Family, Musée du Louvre, Paris (url)
- Edouard Dubufe (1820–1883), 1 painting : Portrait de Marie-Rosalie dite Rosa Bonheur, Musée National du Château, Versailles (url)
- Jacob Duck (1600–1667), 7 paintings : A Couple in an Interior with a Gypsy Fortune-Teller, Metropolitan Museum of Art, New York (url)
- Joseph-François Ducq (1762–1829), 3 paintings : Baron Charles-Louis de Keverberg de Kessel, Groeninge Museum, Bruges (url)
- Gaspard Dughet (1615–1675), 10 paintings : Heroic Landscape with Figures, Residenzgalerie, Salzburg (url)
- Antonio Dugoni (1827–1874), 1 painting : Portrait of Vittorio Emanuele II, Galleria dell'Arte Moderna, Palazzo Pitti, Florence (url)
- Karel Dujardin (1626–1678), 18 paintings : Italian Landscape with a Young Shepherd, Mauritshuis, The Hague (url)
- Pierre Dumonstier (c. 1540–1625), 1 painting : Portrait of a Young Man, The Hermitage, St. Petersburg (url)
- Alexandre Hyacinthe Dunouy (1757–1841), 1 painting : View from a Window of the Boulevard de la Madeleine in Paris, private collection (url)
- Joseph Duplessis (1725–1802), 4 paintings : Portrait of the Comte d'Angiviller, Musée National du Château, Versailles (url)
- Jules Dupré (1811–1889), 2 paintings : Forest Landscape, The Hermitage, St. Petersburg (url)
- Pierre Dupuys (1610–1682), 2 paintings : Basket of Grapes, Musée du Louvre, Paris (url)
- Asher Brown Durand (1796–1886), 2 paintings : A Stream in the Wood, Museo Thyssen-Bornemisza, Madrid (url)
- Albrecht Dürer (1471–1528), 109 paintings : Portrait of Barbara Dürer, Germanisches Nationalmuseum, Nuremberg (url)
- Cornelis Dusart (1660–1704), 2 paintings : Tavern Scene, Szépmûvészeti Múzeum, Budapest (url)
- Jean-Bernard Duvivier (1762–1837), 1 painting : Portrait of the Villers Family, Groeninge Museum, Bruges (url)
- Willem Cornelisz Duyster (1599–1635), 6 paintings : Card-Playing Soldiers, Staatsgalerie, Schleissheim (url)
- William Dyce (1806–1864), 2 paintings : The Virgin and Child, Royal Collection, Windsor (url)
- Anthony van Dyck (1599–1641), 84 paintings : Portrait of a Man in Armour with Red Scarf, Gemäldegalerie, Dresden (url)

== E ==
- Thomas Eakins (1844–1916), 2 paintings : Clara, Musée d'Orsay, Paris (url)
- Ralph Earl (1751–1801), 1 painting : Elijah Boardman, Metropolitan Museum of Art, New York (url)
- Christoffer Wilhelm Eckersberg (1783–1853), 4 paintings : Morning Toilette, Hirschsprung Collection, Copenhagen (url)
- Albert Edelfelt (1854–1905), 2 paintings : In the Luxembourg Gardens, Atheneumin Taidemuseo, Helsinki (url)
- Johann Georg Edlinger (1741–1819), 1 painting : Family Portrait, Neue Pinakothek, Munich (url)
- Gerbrand van den Eeckhout (1621–1674), 17 paintings : Abraham and the Three Angels, The Hermitage, St. Petersburg (url)
- Andries van Eertvelt (1590–1652), 4 paintings : Sea Battle, The Hermitage, St. Petersburg (url)
- Jan Ekels the Younger (1759–1793), 2 paintings : Conversation Piece (The Sense of Smell), Metropolitan Museum of Art, New York (url)
- Jan Frans Eliaerts (1761–1848), 2 paintings : Bouquet of Flowers in a Sculpted Vase, Koninklijk Museum voor Schone Kunsten, Antwerp (url)
- Pieter Janssens Elinga (1623–1682), 3 paintings : Reading Woman, Alte Pinakothek, Munich (url)
- Louijs Arnoutsz Elzevier (1618–1675), 1 painting : Interior of the Oude Kerk, Delft, Seen through a Stone Archway, Museu Nacional de Arte Antiga, Lisbon (url)
- Adam Elsheimer (1578–1610), 18 paintings : Apollo and Coronis, Walker Art Gallery, Liverpool (url)
- Eduard Ender (1822–1883), 4 paintings : "From Darkness, the Light". Allegory of the Hungarian Academy of Sciences, Hungarian Academy of Sciences, Budapest (url)
- Thomas Ender (1793–1875), 2 paintings : The Grossglockner with the Pasterze Glacier, Residenzgalerie, Salzburg (url)
- Cornelis Engebrechtsz. (1468–1533), 6 paintings : Christ Taking Leave of his Mother, Rijksmuseum, Amsterdam (url)
- Erasmus Engert (1796–1871), 1 painting : Viennese Domestic Garden, Nationalgalerie, Berlin (url)
- James Ensor (1860–1949), 1 painting : The Dejected Lady, Royal Museums of Fine Arts of Belgium, Brussels (url)
- Vigilius Eriksen (1722–1783), 1 painting : Portrait of Catherine II before a Mirror, The Hermitage, St. Petersburg (url)
- Jacob van Es (1596–1666), 5 paintings : Grape with Walnut, Národní Galerie, Prague (url)
- Juan Antonio de Frías y Escalante (1633–1670), 4 paintings : An Angel Awakens the Prophet Elijah, Staatliche Museen, Berlin (url)
- Juan Bautista de Espinosa (1590–1641), 3 paintings : Still-Life of Fruit, Museo del Prado, Madrid (url)
- Jerónimo Jacinto de Espinosa (1600–1667), 4 paintings : Still-Life with Grapes, Flowers and Shells, Musée du Louvre, Paris (url)
- Antonio Maria Esquivel (1806–1857), 1 painting : Meeting of Poets in the Artist's Studio, Museo del Prado, Madrid (url)
- Jacob Esselens (1626–1687), 2 paintings : Classical Landscape with Figures, private collection (url)
- Agustín Esteve (1753 – c. 1820), 1 painting : Portrait of a Gentleman, private collection (url)
- Henri Evenepoel (1872–1899), 2 paintings : Sunday in the Bois de Boulogne, Koninklijk Museum voor Schone Kunsten, Antwerp (url)
- Allaert van Everdingen (1621–1675), 7 paintings : End of Village, Szépmûvészeti Múzeum, Budapest (url)
- Caesar van Everdingen (1617–1678), 15 paintings : Allegory of the Birth of Frederik Hendrik, Huis ten Bosch, The Hague (url)
- Willem Eversdijck (1618–1671), 1 painting : Allegory of the Flowering of the Dutch Fishery, Rijksmuseum, Amsterdam (url)
- Hans Eworth (1540–1573), 1 painting : Portrait of Lady Dacre, National Gallery of Canada, Ottawa (url)
- Barthélemy d'Eyck (1444–1469), 2 paintings : Holy Family, Cathedral, Le Puy (url)
- Gaspar van Eyck (1613–1674), 1 painting : Seascape, Museo del Prado, Madrid (url)
- Hubert van Eyck (1366–1426), 1 painting : The Three Marys at the Tomb, Museum Boijmans Van Beuningen, Rotterdam (url)
- Jan van Eyck (1370–1441), 120 paintings : Diptych, Metropolitan Museum of Art, New York (url)

== F ==
- François-Xavier Fabre (1766–1837), 3 paintings : Portrait of Vittorio Alfieri, Galleria degli Uffizi, Florence (url)
- Pietro Fabris (fl. 1740 – 1792), 4 paintings : Naples, a View of Mergellina, private collection (url)
- Barent Fabritius (1624–1673), 6 paintings : Abraham Dismissing Hagar and Ishmael, Metropolitan Museum of Art, New York (url)
- Carel Fabritius (1622–1654), 9 paintings : The Goldfinch, Mauritshuis, The Hague (url)
- Pietro Facchetti (c. 1537–1619), 1 painting : Portrait of a Cardinal, private collection (url)
- Robert Fagan (1761–1816), 2 paintings : Anna Maria Ferri, the Artist's First Wife, Tate Gallery, London (url)
- Aniello Falcone (1607 – c. 1656), 2 paintings : The Anchorite, Galleria Nazionale d'Arte Antica, Rome (url)
- Henri Fantin-Latour (1836–1904), 10 paintings : Self-Portrait, Nationalgalerie, Berlin (url)
- Paolo Farinati (1524–1606), 3 paintings : Portrait of a Man, Museum voor Schone Kunsten, Ghent (url)
- Giovanni Fattori (1825–1908), 4 paintings : The Haystack, Museo Civico Giovanni Fattori, Leghorn (url)
- Giacomo Favretto (1849–1887), 3 paintings : The Guidini Family, Museo d'Arte Moderna, Ca' Pesaro, Venice (url)
- Pieter Feddes van Harlingen (1586–1623), 1 painting : Portrait of a Lady, private collection (url)
- Peter Fendi (1796–1842), 1 painting : The Sad Message, Historisches Museum der Stadt Wien, Vienna (url)
- Adolf Fényes (1867–1945), 5 paintings : Forenoon in a Provincial Town, Magyar Nemzeti Galéria, Budapest (url)
- Károly Ferenczy (1862–1917), 24 paintings : Boys Throwing Stones, Magyar Nemzeti Galéria, Budapest (url)
- Franz de Paula Ferg (1689–1740), 2 paintings : Italianate Landscape with Figures by Classical Ruins, private collection (url)
- William Gouw Ferguson (1632–1700), 2 paintings : Still-Life with Birds, Rijksmuseum, Amsterdam (url)
- Vasco Fernandes (1500–1542), 3 paintings : Adoration of the Magi, Vasco Museum, Viseu (url)
- Alejo Fernández (c. 1475 – c. 1545), 1 painting : The Scourging of Christ, Museo del Prado, Madrid (url)
- Juan Fernández el Labrador (c. 1625–1657), 2 paintings : Vase of Flowers, Museo del Prado, Madrid (url)
- Pedro Fernández (ca. 1480–after 1521), 3 paintings : Christ Suffering, Museo de Arte, Gerona (url)
- Francesco Fernandi (1679–1740), 1 painting : Soldiers of Fortune, private collection (url)
- John Ferneley (1782–1860), 3 paintings : A Favourite Bay Hunter, private collection (url)
- Defendente Ferrari (1480–1485 – c. 1540), 1 painting : Madonna and Child, Galleria Palatina (Palazzo Pitti), Florence (url)
- Gaudenzio Ferrari (c. 1475–1546), 3 paintings : The Martyrdom of St Catherine of Alexandria, Pinacoteca di Brera, Milan (url)
- Giovanni Andrea de Ferrari (1598–1669), 1 painting : Martha and Mary Magdalene, private collection (url)
- Gregorio de Ferrari (1647–1726), 2 paintings : Hercules and Antaeus, Palazzo Cattaneo, Genoa (url)
- Lorenzo De Ferrari (1680–1744), 1 painting : Adam and Eve with the Infants Cain and Abel, private collection (url)
- Luca Ferrari (1605–1654), 2 paintings : Allegory of Jealousy, The Hermitage, St. Petersburg (url)
- Giovanni Domenico Ferretti (1692–1768), 1 painting : The Rape of Europa, Galleria degli Uffizi, Florence (url)
- Ciro Ferri (c. 1634–1689), 2 paintings : The Reconciliation of Jacob and Laban, private collection (url)
- Domenico Fetti (c. 1589–1623), 24 paintings : David, Gallerie dell'Accademia, Venice (url)
- Lucrina Fetti (c. 1590–1651), 2 paintings : St Margaret, Palmer Museum of Art, The Pennsylvania State University, University Park (url)
- Anselm Feuerbach (1829–died 1880), 8 paintings : Medea, Neue Pinakothek, Munich (url)
- Paolo Fiammingo (c. 1540–1596), 1 painting : Apollo and Poseidon Punishing Troy, Szépmûvészeti Múzeum, Budapest (url)
- Felice Ficherelli (1603–1660), 1 painting : The Death of Cleopatra, National Gallery of Slovenia, Ljubljana (url)
- Orazio Fidani (1606–1656), 1 painting : The Flutist, The Hermitage, St. Petersburg (url)
- Giovanni Ambrogio Figino (1548–1608), 5 paintings : St Matthew and the Angel, San Raffaele Arcangelo, Milan (url)
- Cristóvão de Figueiredo (1515–1543), 1 painting : Deposition, Patriarcado, Lisbon (url)
- Alfred William Finch (1854–1930), 1 painting : Haystacks, Musée d'Ixelles, Brussels (url)
- Paolo Domenico Finoglia (c. 1590–1645), 1 painting : Annunciation, Szépmûvészeti Múzeum, Budapest (url)
- Louis Finson (1580–1617), 1 painting : Allegory of the Four Elements, private collection (url)
- Johann Fischbach (1797–1871), 1 painting : View of Salzburg with the Kapuzinerberg, Residenzgalerie, Salzburg (url)
- Vinzenz Fischer (1729–1810), 1 painting : Moses Tramples on Pharaoh's Crown, Akademie der bildenden Künste, Vienna (url)
- François Flameng (1856–1923), 1 painting : Reception at Compiègne in 1810, The Hermitage, St. Petersburg (url)
- Hippolyte Flandrin (1809–1864), 4 paintings : Young Man by the Sea, Musée du Louvre, Paris (url)
- Georg Flegel (1563–1638), 11 paintings : Still-Life with Bread and Confectionery, Städelsches Kunstinstitut, Frankfurt (url)
- Bertholet Flemalle (1614–1675), 3 paintings : Heliodorus Driven from the Temple, Royal Museums of Fine Arts of Belgium, Brussels (url)
- Govert Flinck (1615–1660), 14 paintings : Angels Announcing the Birth of Christ to the Shepherds, Musée du Louvre, Paris (url)
- Sebastiano Florigerio (c. 1500–1543), 1 painting : Portrait of Raffaele Grassi, Galleria degli Uffizi, Florence (url)
- Frans Floris (1519–1570), 9 paintings : Banquet of the Gods, Koninklijk Museum voor Schone Kunsten, Antwerp (url)
- Franz Ignaz Flurer (1688–1742), 1 painting : Seacoast with Travellers and a Town, National Gallery of Slovenia, Ljubljana (url)
- Karl Philipp Fohr (1795–1818), 2 paintings : Ideal Landscape near Rocca Canterana, Museum Schloss Fasanerie, Eichenzell (url)
- Lavinia Fontana (1552–1614), 17 paintings : Portrait of a Newborn in a Cradle, Pinacoteca Nazionale, Bologna (url)
- Prospero Fontana (1512–1597), 4 paintings : The Adoration of the Shepherds, private collection (url)
- Antonio Fontanesi (1818–1882), 1 painting : Countryside, Galleria dell'Arte Moderna, Palazzo Pitti, Florence (url)
- Francesco Fontebasso (1707–1769), 5 paintings : The Last Supper, The Hermitage, St. Petersburg (url)
- Vincenzo Foppa (1427/30–1515/16), 1 painting : The Adoration of the Kings, National Gallery, London (url)
- Girolamo Forabosco (1605–1679), 2 paintings : David with the Head of Goliath, Liechtenstein Museum, Vienna (url)
- Jean-Louis Forain (1852–1931), 2 paintings : Ball at the Paris Opéra, Pushkin Museum, Moscow (url)
- James Forrester (1730–1776), 1 painting : A View of the Isola Tiberina, Rome, private collection (url)
- Luca Forte (1615–1670), 2 paintings : Still-Life, Matthiesen Gallery, London (url)
- Marià Fortuny (1838–1874), 4 paintings : Fortuny's Garden, Museo del Prado, Madrid (url)
- Pier Francesco Foschi (1502–1567), 2 paintings : Portrait of a Lady, Museo Thyssen-Bornemisza, Madrid (url)
- Jacques Fouquier (1590–1659), 1 painting : Winter Landscape, Fitzwilliam Museum, Cambridge (url)
- Cesare Fracanzano (c. 1605–1651), 1 painting : St Ambrose, Bowes Museum, Barnard Castle (url)
- Francesco Fracanzano (1612–1656), 1 painting : Fortune Teller, private collection (url)
- Pietro Fragiacomo (1856–1922), 1 painting : Sad Sunset, Museo d'Arte Moderna, Ca' Pesaro, Venice (url)
- Alexandre-Évariste Fragonard (1780–1850), 3 paintings : Vivant Denon Replacing El Cid's Remains in their Tombs, Musée Antoine-Lecuyer, St Quentin (url)
- Jean-Honoré Fragonard (1732–1806), 49 paintings : Jeroboam Offering Sacrifice for the Idol, École des Beaux-Arts, Paris (url)
- Baldassare Franceschini (1611–1690), 6 paintings : One of Father Arlotto's Tricks, Galleria Palatina (Palazzo Pitti), Florence (url)
- Marcantonio Franceschini (1648–1729), 3 paintings : Birth of Adonis, Liechtenstein Museum, Vienna (url)
- Francesco di Simone da Santacroce (c. 1440 – 1508), 1 painting : Annunciation, Accademia Carrara, Bergamo (url)
- Antonio Franchi (1638–1709), 1 painting : Personification of Music (St Cecilia), private collection (url)
- Peter Franchoys (1606–1654), 2 paintings : Self-Portrait, The Hermitage, St. Petersburg (url)
- Francesco Francia (1447–1517), 5 paintings : Crucifixion with Sts John and Jerome, Collezioni Comunali d'Arte, Bologna (url)
- Franciabigio (1482–1525), 4 paintings : Madonna with Child and the Young St John, Liechtenstein Museum, Vienna (url)
- Ambrosius Francken I (1544–1618), 1 painting : Descent from the Cross, O.-L. Vrouwekathedraal, Antwerp (url)
- Frans Francken I (1542–1616), 1 painting : Jesus among the Doctors, O.-L. Vrouwekathedraal, Antwerp (url)
- Frans Francken the Younger (1581–1642), 15 paintings : Allegory on the Abdication of Emperor Charles V in Brussels, 25 October 1555,, Rijksmuseum, Amsterdam (url)
- Frans Francken III (1607–1667), 2 paintings : Genre Scene, Residenzgalerie, Salzburg (url)
- Hieronymous Francken I (1540–1610), 1 painting : Courtiers Strolling in a Garden, private collection (url)
- Hieronymous Francken II (1578–1623), 2 paintings : The Last Judgment, Residenzgalerie, Salzburg (url)
- Hieronymous Francken III (1611–1671), 2 paintings : Carrying the Cross, The Hermitage, St. Petersburg (url)
- Battista Franco Veneziano (1498–1561), 1 painting : The Battle of Montemurlo and the Rape of Ganymede, Galleria Palatina (Palazzo Pitti), Florence (url)
- Guy François (1578/79–1650), 1 painting : Holy Family with St Bruno and St Elisabeth, Musée de l'Ain, Bourg-en-Bresse (url)
- Niccolò Frangipane (1563–1585), 3 paintings : Pietà, Santa Maria Gloriosa dei Frari, Venice (url)
- Jean-Pierre Franque (1774–1860), 1 painting : Allegory of the State of France before the Return from Egypt, Musée du Louvre, Paris (url)
- Vincenzo di Antonio Frediani (fl. 1481 – 1505), 1 painting : Lamentation, private collection (url)
- Caspar David Friedrich (1774–1840), 58 paintings : Wreck in the Sea of Ice, Kunsthalle, Hamburg (url)
- Ernst Fries (1801–1833), 1 painting : The Liris Waterfalls near Isola di Sora, Neue Pinakothek, Munich (url)
- Frederick Carl Frieseke (1874–1939), 1 painting : Lady in a Garden, Terra Foundation for American Art, Chicago (url)
- Nicolas Froment (c. 1435 – c. 1486), 2 paintings : Matheron Diptych, Musée du Louvre, Paris (url)
- Eugène Fromentin (1820–1876), 2 paintings : Scene in the Desert, The Hermitage, St. Petersburg (url)
- William Edward Frost (1810–1877), 1 painting : L'Allegro, Royal Collection, Windsor (url)
- Heinrich Füger (1751–1818), 5 paintings : Alcestis Sacrifices Herself for Admetus, Akademie der bildenden Künste, Vienna (url)
- Joseph von Führich (1800–1876), 1 painting : Jacob Encountering Rachel with her Father's Herds, Österreichische Galerie, Vienna (url)
- Giovanni Antonio Fumiani (c. 1645–1710), 1 painting : Martyrdom and Glory of St Pantaleon, San Pantalon, Venice (url)
- Bernardino Fungai (1460–1516), 3 paintings : The Magnanimity of Scipio Africanus, The Hermitage, St. Petersburg (url)
- Francesco Furini (1600–1646), 6 paintings : The Birth of Rachel, Alte Pinakothek, Munich (url)
- Henry Fuseli (1741–1825), 12 paintings : Ezzelin and Meduna, Sir John Soane's Museum, London (url)
- Jan Fyt (1611–1661), 18 paintings : Big Dog, Dwarf and Boy, Gemäldegalerie, Dresden (url)

== G ==
- Anton Domenico Gabbiani (1652–1726), 4 paintings : Portrait of Three Musicians of the Medici Court, Galleria dell'Accademia, Florence (url)
- Bénigne Gagneraux (1756–1795), 1 painting : Lion Hunt, private collection (url)
- Thomas Gainsborough (1727–1788), 23 paintings : Conversation in a Park, Musée du Louvre, Paris (url)
- Nicolaes van Galen (fl. 1650s), 1 painting : Count Willem III Presides over the Execution of the Dishonest Bailiff in 1336, Town Hall, Hasselt (url)
- Fede Galizia (1578–1630), 13 paintings : White Ceramic Bowl with Peaches and Red and Blue Plums, Silvano Lodi Collection, Campione (url)
- Louis Gallait (1810–1887), 3 paintings : Monk Feeding the Poor, Neue Pinakothek, Munich (url)
- Fernando Gallego (c. 1440–1507), 1 painting : The Blessing Christ, Museo del Prado, Madrid (url)
- Akseli Gallen-Kallela (1865–1931), 1 painting : Démasquée, Atheneumin Taidemuseo, Helsinki (url)
- Louis Galloche (1670–1761), 1 painting : Diana and Actaeon, The Hermitage, St. Petersburg (url)
- Gaetano Gandolfi (1734–1802), 5 paintings : The Agony of Christ, private collection (url)
- Mauro Gandolfi (1764–1834), 1 painting : Head Study of an Elderly Bearded Man, private collection (url)
- Ubaldo Gandolfi (1728–1781), 2 paintings : A Bearded Man, private collection (url)
- Jan Anton Garemyn (1712–1799), 2 paintings : Garden of the Willaeys-Vleys Family at Groeninge, Bruges, Groeninge Museum, Bruges (url)
- Étienne-Barthélémy Garnier (1759–1849), 1 painting : Diana and Her Nymphs, private collection (url)
- François Garnier (d. 1672–1672), 1 painting : Cherries and Gooseberries on a Table, Musée du Louvre, Paris (url)
- Il Garofalo (c. 1481–1559), 7 paintings : Christ and the Adulteress, Szépmûvészeti Múzeum, Budapest (url)
- Pietro Francesco Garoli (1638–1716), 1 painting : Interior of the Basilica of San Paolo in Rome, Galleria Sabauda, Turin (url)
- Eduard Gärtner (1801–1877), 5 paintings : Staircase in the Berlin Palace, Schloss Charlottenburg, Berlin (url)
- Giovanna Garzoni (1600–1670), 2 paintings : Bitch, Galleria Palatina (Palazzo Pitti), Florence (url)
- Lucas Gassel (c. 1490–1568), 1 painting : Landscape with the Penitent St Jerome, private collection (url)
- Louis Gauffier (1761–1801), 1 painting : Ulysses Recognises Achilles amongst the Daughters of Lycomedes, private collection (url)
- Paul Gauguin (1848–1903), 126 paintings : The Seine at the Pont d'Iéna, Snowy Weather, Musée d'Orsay, Paris (url)
- Léo Gausson (1860–1944), 1 painting : Undergrowth, private collection (url)
- Joost van Geel (1631–1698), 1 painting : Landscape, Rijksmuseum, Amsterdam (url)
- Geertgen tot Sint Jans (1460–1495), 15 paintings : Adoration of the Kings, Rijksmuseum, Amsterdam (url)
- Lorenzo Gelati (1824–1893), 1 painting : Fra Angelico in the Refectory of San Domenico, Galleria Palatina (Palazzo Pitti), Florence (url)
- Aert de Gelder (1645–1727), 9 paintings : Ahimelech Giving the Sword of Goliath to David, J. Paul Getty Museum, Los Angeles (url)
- Gortzius Geldorp (1553–1618), 2 paintings : Portrait of a Man, private collection (url)
- Girolamo Genga (1476–1551), 3 paintings : St Augustine Baptizes the Cathechumens, Accademia Carrara, Bergamo (url)
- Benedetto Gennari (1594–1661), 1 painting : Orpheus Playing His Lyre, Peoria Riverfront Museum, Peoria, Ill. (url)
- Benedetto Gennari II (1633–1715), 1 painting : Portrait of Marchese Francesco Fiaschi, private collection (url)
- Cesare Gennari (1637–1688), 1 painting : Cleopatra, private collection (url)
- Gentile da Fabriano (1375–1427), 2 paintings : Quaratesi Polyptych: St Nicholas and Three Poor Maidens, Pinacoteca, Vatican (url)
- Artemisia Gentileschi (1593–1652), 19 paintings : Bathsheba, Neues Palais, Potsdam (url)
- Orazio Gentileschi (1563–1639), 20 paintings : Two Women with a Mirror, Alte Pinakothek, Munich (url)
- Jean Jules Henry Geoffroy (1853–1924), 1 painting : Study of an Old Woman's Head, The Hermitage, St. Petersburg (url)
- François Gérard (1770–1837), 14 paintings : Jean-Baptist Isabey, Miniaturist, with his Daughter, Musée du Louvre, Paris (url)
- Marguerite Gérard (1761 Grasse–1837), 5 paintings : Artist Painting a Portrait of a Musician, The Hermitage, St. Petersburg (url)
- Théodore Géricault (1791–1824), 21 paintings : An Officer of the Chasseurs Commanding a Charge, Musée du Louvre, Paris (url)
- Jean-Léon Gérôme (1824–1904), 5 paintings : Young Greeks at a Cockfight, Musée d'Orsay, Paris (url)
- Henri Gervex (1852–1929), 1 painting : The Salon Jury, Musée d'Orsay, Paris (url)
- Marcus Gheeraerts the Younger (1561–1636), 7 paintings : Sir Francis Drake, Buckland Abbey, Devon (url)
- Antonio Gherardi (1638–1702), 1 painting : Battle Scene, private collection (url)
- Filippo Gherardi (1643–1704), 2 paintings : The Triumph of Wisdom, Convent of San Giorgio Maggiore, Venice (url)
- Jacob de Gheyn II (1565–1629), 3 paintings : Neptune and Amphitrite, Wallraf-Richartz-Museum, Cologne (url)
- Ridolfo Ghirlandaio (1483–1561), 9 paintings : Adoration of the Shepherds, Szépmûvészeti Múzeum, Budapest (url)
- Fra Galgario (1655–1743), 10 paintings : Portrait of a Gentleman, Museo Poldi Pezzoli, Milan (url)
- Giampietrino (1520–1540), 5 paintings : Leda and her Children, Staatliche Museen, Kassel (url)
- Corrado Giaquinto (1703–1766), 11 paintings : Adoration of the Magi, Museum of Fine Arts, Boston (url)
- Thomas Gibson (artist) (c. 1680–1751), 1 painting : Portrait of a Girl Feeding a Deer, private collection (url)
- Giacinto Gigante (1806–1876), 1 painting : Storm over the Bay of Amalfi, Museo Nazionale di Capodimonte, Naples (url)
- Cornelis Norbertus Gysbrechts (d1675), 5 paintings : Quodlibet, Wallraf-Richartz-Museum, Cologne (url)
- Peeter Gijsels (1621–1690), 5 paintings : River Landscape, private collection (url)
- Jan Pauwel Gillemans the Elder (1618–1675), 1 painting : Still-Life, private collection (url)
- Jan Pauwel Gillemans the Younger (1651–1704), 2 paintings : Still-Life, Galleria Palatina (Palazzo Pitti), Florence (url)
- Nicolaes Gillis (1595–1632), 1 painting : Laid Table, private collection (url)
- Claude Gillot (1673–1722), 2 paintings : The Two Coaches, Musée du Louvre, Paris (url)
- Harold Gilman (1876–1919), 1 painting : Canal Bridge, Flekkefjord, Tate Gallery, London (url)
- Sawrey Gilpin (1733–1807), 5 paintings : A Dark Bay and a Grey Horse, private collection (url)
- Francisco Gimeno Arasa (1858–1927), 1 painting : Blue Water, Museo del Prado, Madrid (url)
- Giacinto Gimignani (1606–1681), 2 paintings : An Angel and a Devil Fighting for the Soul of a Child, private collection (url)
- Luca Giordano (1632–1705), 31 paintings : Christ Cleansing the Temple, Bob Jones University Collection, Greenville (url)
- Giorgione (1477–1510), 40 paintings : Portrait of a Young Man, Staatliche Museen, Berlin (url)
- Giotto (1266–1337), 1 painting : Navicella, Fabbrica di San Pietro, Rome (url)
- Giovanni Agostino da Lodi (1495–1525), 1 painting : Virgin and Child Enthroned with Saints, San Pietro Martire, Murano (url)
- Giovanni da San Giovanni (1592–1636), 1 painting : Venus Combing Cupid's Hair, Galleria Palatina (Palazzo Pitti), Florence (url)
- Giovanni di Paolo (1403–1482), 1 painting : Sts Clare and Elizabeth of Hungary, private collection (url)
- Anne-Louis Girodet de Roussy-Trioson (1767–1824), 13 paintings : The Entombment of Atala, Musée du Louvre, Paris (url)
- Girolamo da Treviso (c. 1497–1544), 3 paintings : A Protestant Allegory, Royal Collection, Windsor (url)
- Girolamo di Benvenuto (1470–1524), 1 painting : Portrait of a Young Woman, National Gallery of Art, Washington (url)
- Giulio Romano (1499–1546), 13 paintings : Triumph of Titus and Vespasian, Musée du Louvre, Paris (url)
- Marc-Charles-Gabriel Gleyre (1806–1874), 3 paintings : Evening or Lost Illusions, Kunstmuseum, Winterthur (url)
- John Glover (1767–1849), 3 paintings : A Corroboree in Van Diemen's Land, Musée du Louvre, Paris (url)
- Pierre Gobert (1662–1744), 3 paintings : Portrait of the Duchess of Modena as Hébé, Château de Versailles, Versailles (url)
- Michel Gobin (fl. 1680s), 1 painting : Young Man with a Candle, Musée des Beaux-Arts, Orléans (url)
- Norbert Goeneutte (1854–1894), 5 paintings : Boulevard Clichy under Snow, Tate Gallery, London (url)
- Hugo van der Goes (1440–1482), 63 paintings : Crucifixion, Museo Correr, Venice (url)
- Vincent van Gogh (1853–1890), 330 paintings : Still-Life with Yellow Straw Hat, Rijksmuseum Kröller-Müller, Otterlo (url)
- Hendrik Goltzius (1558–1617), 7 paintings : Hercules and Cacus, Frans Halsmuseum, Haarlem (url)
- Nuno Gonçalves (1450–1471), 1 painting : Altarpiece of Saint Vincent, the panel of the Infants, Museu Nacional de Arte Antiga, Lisbon (url)
- Eva Gonzalès (1849–1883), 3 paintings : Morning Awakening, Kunsthalle, Bremen (url)
- Antonio González Velázquez (1723–1794), 2 paintings : Self-Portrait, Museo del Prado, Madrid (url)
- Zacarías González Velázquez (1763–1834), 3 paintings : Self-Portrait, Museo del Prado, Madrid (url)
- Bartolomé González y Serrano (1564–1627), 4 paintings : Portrait of Margarita Aldobrandini, Duchess of Parma, The Hermitage, St. Petersburg (url)
- Thomas Gooch (1750–1802), 2 paintings : Welsh Springer Spaniel, private collection (url)
- Michele Gordigiani (1830–1909), 1 painting : Portrait of Thomas Carlyle, Galleria dell'Arte Moderna, Palazzo Pitti, Florence (url)
- John Watson Gordon (1788–1864), 1 painting : Portrait of Charles Lamb, private collection (url)
- Spencer Gore (1878–1914), 1 painting : Mornington Crescent, Tate Gallery, London (url)
- Jan Gossaert (1478–1532), 101 paintings : Agony in the Garden, Staatliche Museen, Berlin (url)
- Abraham Govaerts (1589–1626), 4 paintings : Landscape with Diana Receiving the Head of a Boar, Národní Galerie, Prague (url)
- Francisco Goya (1746–1828), 132 paintings : The Quail Shoot, Museo del Prado, Madrid (url)
- Jan van Goyen (1596–1656), 41 paintings : Sandy Road with a Farmhouse, Metropolitan Museum of Art, New York (url)
- Benozzo Gozzoli (1420–1497), 1 painting : Descent from the Cross, Museo Horne, Florence (url)
- Barend Graat (1628–1709), 1 painting : Equestrian Portrait of a Gentleman, private collection (url)
- Carl Graeb (1816–1884), 1 painting : View of Athens, Lindenau-Museum, Altenburg (url)
- Anton Graff (1736–1813), 4 paintings : Portrait of the Painter Daniel Nikolaus Chodowiecki, Staatliche Museen, Berlin (url)
- Antiveduto Gramatica (c. 1571–1626), 4 paintings : St Cecilia with Two Angels, Kunsthistorisches Museum, Vienna (url)
- Daniel Gran (1694–1757), 1 painting : St Elizabeth Distributing Alms, Szépmûvészeti Múzeum, Budapest (url)
- Francesco Granacci (1469–1543), 1 painting : Entry of Charles VIII into Florence, Galleria degli Uffizi, Florence (url)
- François Marius Granet (1775–1849), 8 paintings : Crypt of San Martino ai Monti, Rome, Musée Fabre, Montpellier (url)
- Josef Grassi (1758–1838), 1 painting : Portrait of a Lady, private collection (url)
- Nicolò Grassi (1682–1748), 3 paintings : The Flagellation of Christ, Szépmûvészeti Múzeum, Budapest (url)
- Pieter de Grebber (1600–1653), 12 paintings : Baptism of Christ, St Stephanus Church, Beckum (url)
- El Greco (1541–1614), 230 paintings : The Entombment of Christ, Alexandros Soutzos Museum, Athens (url)
- Gennaro Greco (1663–1714), 1 painting : Architectural Capriccio, private collection (url)
- Albert Gregorius (1774–1853), 1 painting : Portrait of Count Charles A. Chasset, Groeninge Museum, Bruges (url)
- Jean-Baptiste Greuze (1725–1805), 29 paintings : L'Accordée de Village, Musée du Louvre, Paris (url)
- Alessandro Grevenbroeck (1717–1747), 1 painting : Mediterranean Port in Moonlight, Akademie der bildenden Künste, Vienna (url)
- Nicolae Grigorescu (1838–1907), 1 painting : A Clearing, Muzeul National de Arta, Bucharest (url)
- Abel Grimmer (1570–1619), 8 paintings : Spring, Koninklijk Museum voor Schone Kunsten, Antwerp (url)
- Jacob Grimmer (1526–1590), 5 paintings : Spring, Szépmûvészeti Múzeum, Budapest (url)
- Alexis Grimou (1678–1733), 2 paintings : Young Pilgrim Girl, Galleria degli Uffizi, Florence (url)
- Louis-Joseph Grisée (1822–1867), 1 painting : François I visiting Benvenuto Cellini at the Castle of Nesle, private collection (url)
- Ivan Grohar (1867–1911), 1 painting : Snow in Skofja Loka, Moderna Galerija, Ljubljana (url)
- Bartholomeus Grondonck (1617–1617), 1 painting : Kermesse of Oudenarde, private collection (url)
- Antoine-Jean Gros (1771–1835), 10 paintings : Madame Pasteur, Musée du Louvre, Paris (url)
- Carlo Grubacs (1812–1870), 2 paintings : A Venetian Palace, private collection (url)
- Vittore Grubicy de Dragon (1851–1920), 2 paintings : Morning. Autumn Landscape with Trees, Musée d'Orsay, Paris (url)
- Norbert Grund (1717–1767), 3 paintings : Christ on the Rest, private collection (url)
- Matthias Grünewald (1470/80–1528), 81 paintings : The Crucifixion, Öffentliche Kunstsammlung, Basel (url)
- Jacopo Guarana (1720–1808), 1 painting : Apollo Conducting a Choir of Maidens, Ospedaletto, Venice (url)
- Francesco Guardi (1712–1793), 72 paintings : The Parlor of the Nuns at San Zaccaria, Museo del Settecento Veneziano, Ca' Rezzonico, Venice (url)
- Giacomo Guardi (1764–1835), 1 painting : Landscape in the Environs of Venice, Szépmûvészeti Múzeum, Budapest (url)
- Giovanni Antonio Guardi (1699–1760), 16 paintings : The Marriage of Tobias, Chiesa dell'Angelo Raffaele, Venice (url)
- Théodore Gudin (1802–1880), 1 painting : Storm in the Sea, The Hermitage, St. Petersburg (url)
- Guercino (1591–1666), 48 paintings : Angels Weeping over the Dead Christ, National Gallery, London (url)
- Jean-Baptiste Paulin Guérin (1783–1855), 1 painting : Self-Portrait, private collection (url)
- Pierre-Narcisse Guérin (1774–1833), 8 paintings : The Return of Marcus Sextus, Musée du Louvre, Paris (url)
- Gregorio Guglielmi (1714–1773), 1 painting : Apotheosis of the Reign of Catherine II, The Hermitage, St. Petersburg (url)
- Armand Guillaumin (1841–1927), 13 paintings : A Path in the Snow, Musée d'Orsay, Paris (url)
- Juan Simón Gutiérrez (1643–1718), 1 painting : The Holy Family, private collection (url)
- Franciscus Gijsbrechts (1649–1677), 1 painting : Vanitas, Koninklijk Museum voor Schone Kunsten, Antwerp (url)

== H ==
- Joris van der Haagen (1615–1669), 1 painting : Forest Landscape, private collection (url)
- John Haberle (1856–1933), 1 painting : The Slate, Museum of Fine Arts, Boston (url)
- Jan Hackaert (1628–1685), 1 painting : River Scene, Wallraf-Richartz-Museum, Cologne (url)
- Jacob Philipp Hackert (1737–1807), 10 paintings : Autumn, Wallraf-Richartz-Museum, Cologne (url)
- Willem van Haecht (1593–1697), 1 painting : The Gallery of Cornelis van der Geest, Rubenshuis, Antwerp (url)
- Carlos de Haes (1826–1898), 1 painting : Stream at Pont-Aven, Museo del Prado, Madrid (url)
- August Matthias Hagen (1794–1878), 1 painting : Sea Bay, The Hermitage, St. Petersburg (url)
- Nikolaus Haguenauer (1493–1526), 1 painting : Isenheim Altarpiece (third view), Musée d'Unterlinden, Colmar (url)
- Georg Hainz (1630–1700), 1 painting : Cabinets of Curiosities, Kunsthalle, Hamburg (url)
- Philip Leslie Hale (1865–1931), 1 painting : The Crimson Rambler, Pennsylvania Academy of Fine Arts, Philadelphia (url)
- Noël Hallé (1711–1781), 1 painting : The Race between Hippomenes and Atalanta, Musée du Louvre, Paris (url)
- Dirck Hals (1591–1656), 15 paintings : Banquet Scene in a Renaissance Hall, Akademie der bildenden Künste, Vienna (url)
- Frans Hals (1582–1666), 150 paintings : Jacobus Zaffius, Frans Halsmuseum, Haarlem (url)
- Frans Hals Junior (1618–1669), 1 painting : Young Soldier, The Hermitage, St. Petersburg (url)
- Harmen Hals (1611–1669), 1 painting : Peasants at a Wedding Feast, Szépmûvészeti Múzeum, Budapest (url)
- Nicolaes Hals (1628–1686), 1 painting : Dune Landscape, private collection (url)
- Juan van der Hamen (1596–1631), 9 paintings : Offering to Flora, Museo del Prado, Madrid (url)
- Gavin Hamilton (1723–1798), 3 paintings : The Oath of Brutus, Yale Center for British Art, New Haven (url)
- Hugh Douglas Hamilton (1739–1808), 1 painting : Cupid and Psyche in the Nuptial Bower, National Gallery of Ireland, Dublin (url)
- Johann Georg de Hamilton (1672–1737), 1 painting : Portrait of a Piebald, Liechtenstein Museum, Vienna (url)
- Philipp Ferdinand de Hamilton (1664–1750), 2 paintings : Dead Game, The Hermitage, St. Petersburg (url)
- Edouard Hamman (1819–1888), 1 painting : Disillusion, The Hermitage, St. Petersburg (url)
- Vilhelm Hammershøi (1864–1916), 3 paintings : Sunny Chamber, Nationalgalerie, Berlin (url)
- Adriaen Hanneman (1603–1671), 2 paintings : Portrait of a Woman, Metropolitan Museum of Art, New York (url)
- Anton Hansch (1813–1876), 1 painting : The Grossvenediger, Residenzgalerie, Salzburg (url)
- George Henry Harlow (1787–1819), 2 paintings : Robert William Elliston, National Portrait Gallery, London (url)
- William Harnett (1848–1892), 2 paintings : Materials for a Leisure Hour, Museo Thyssen-Bornemisza, Madrid (url)
- Henri Harpignies (1819–1916), 3 paintings : View of the Island of Capri, private collection (url)
- Johannes Jakob Hartmann (1680–1731), 2 paintings : Landscape with St John the Baptist Preaching, private collection (url)
- Johann Peter Hasenclever (1810–1853), 1 painting : Hieronymus Jobs at His Exam, Neue Pinakothek, Munich (url)
- Childe Hassam (1859–1935), 9 paintings : The 14th July, Rue Daunou, Metropolitan Museum of Art, New York (url)
- Jacob Gerritsz van Hasselt (1598–1674), 1 painting : Wedding Dinner, Centraal Museum, Utrecht (url)
- Hortense Haudebourt-Lescot (1784–1845), 4 paintings : Self-Portrait, Musée du Louvre, Paris (url)
- Margaretha Haverman (1715–1723), 1 painting : A Vase of Flowers, Metropolitan Museum of Art, New York (url)
- Louis Welden Hawkins (1849–1910), 1 painting : Portrait of Séverine, Musée d'Orsay, Paris (url)
- Benjamin Haydon (1786–1846), 2 paintings : Christ's Entry into Jerusalem, Mount St Mary's Seminary, Cincinnati (url)
- Louis Hayet (1864–1940), 1 painting : Place de la Concorde, Paris, private collection (url)
- Francesco Hayez (1791–1882), 18 paintings : Rinaldo and Armida, Gallerie dell'Accademia, Venice (url)
- George Hayter (1792–1871), 2 paintings : Portrait of Countess Yelizaveta Vorontsova, The Hermitage, St. Petersburg (url)
- Martin Johnson Heade (1819–1904), 2 paintings : Spouting Rock, Newport, Museo Thyssen-Bornemisza, Madrid (url)
- Willem Claeszoon Heda (1594–1680), 21 paintings : Breakfast Still-Life, Musée du Louvre, Paris (url)
- Cornelis de Heem (1631–1695), 8 paintings : Flower Still-Life, Národní Galerie, Prague (url)
- Jan Davidsz. de Heem (1606–1683), 37 paintings : Banquet Piece, Akademie der bildenden Künste, Vienna (url)
- Egbert van Heemskerck (1634–1704), 4 paintings : Two Peasants and a Woman in an Inn, private collection (url)
- Egbert van Heemskerck II (1666–1744), 2 paintings : Interior of an Inn, private collection (url)
- Maarten van Heemskerck (1498–1574), 22 paintings : Portrait of Anna Codde, Rijksmuseum, Amsterdam (url)
- Thomas Heeremans (1641–1694), 3 paintings : River Landscape, private collection (url)
- Josef Heideloff (1743–1830), 1 painting : View from the Prater towards the Suburbs of Vienna, Akademie der bildenden Künste, Vienna (url)
- Daniel van Heil (1604–1662), 1 painting : Fall of Troy, private collection (url)
- François-Joseph Heim (1787–1865), 2 paintings : Charles V Distributing Awards to the Artists at the Close of the Salon of 1824, Musée du Louvre, Paris (url)
- Joseph Heintz the Elder (1564–1609), 3 paintings : Diana and Actaeon, Kunsthistorisches Museum, Vienna (url)
- Joseph Heintz II (1600–1688), 3 paintings : The Bull Hunt in Campo San Polo, Museo Correr, Venice (url)
- Johann Heiss (1640–1704), 3 paintings : Allegory of Winter, The Hermitage, St. Petersburg (url)
- Bartholomeus van der Helst (1613–1670), 11 paintings : Celebration of the Peace of Münster, 1648, at the Crossbowmen's Headquarters, Rijksmuseum, Amsterdam (url)
- Nicolaes de Helt Stockade (1614–1669), 1 painting : Portrait of Two Children, private collection (url)
- Caterina van Hemessen (1528–1587), 1 painting : Self-Portrait, Öffentliche Kunstsammlung, Basel (url)
- Jan Sanders van Hemessen (1500–1575), 17 paintings : Allegorical Scene, Rijksmuseum, Amsterdam (url)
- Francisco Henriques (1502–1518), 2 paintings : Apparition of Christ to Magdalen, Museu Nacional de Arte Antiga, Lisbon (url)
- Willem van Herp (1613–1677), 1 painting : The Visitation, private collection (url)
- Francisco Herrera the Elder (c. 1590–1656), 6 paintings : St Bonaventura Receiving the Host from the Hands of an Angel, Musée du Louvre, Paris (url)
- Francisco de Herrera the Younger (1622–1685), 2 paintings : Stigmatisation of St Francis, Cathedral, Seville (url)
- Willem Jacob Herreyns (1743–1827), 2 paintings : Supper at Emmaus, O.-L. Vrouwekathedraal, Antwerp (url)
- John Frederick Herring, Sr. (1795–1865), 2 paintings : 'Mameluke', the Winner of the Derby Stakes at Epsom, 1827, private collection (url)
- Heinrich Maria von Hess (1798–1863), 2 paintings : Marchesa Florenzi, Neue Pinakothek, Munich (url)
- Peter von Hess (1792–1871), 2 paintings : The Entry of King Othon of Greece into Nauplia, Neue Pinakothek, Munich (url)
- Philipp Friedrich von Hetsch (1758–1838), 3 paintings : Baroness Elisabeth Christiane von Bouwinghausen, Germanisches Nationalmuseum, Nuremberg (url)
- Jacob de Heusch (1657–1701), 5 paintings : Italian Harbour, The Hermitage, St. Petersburg (url)
- Claes van Heussen (1598–1633), 1 painting : Fruit and Vegetable Seller, private collection (url)
- Jan van der Heyden (1637–1712), 17 paintings : Dam Square, Amsterdam, Historisch Museum, Amsterdam (url)
- Hans Heyerdahl (1857–1913), 1 painting : At the Window, Nasjonalgalleriet, Oslo (url)
- Thomas Hickey (1741–1824), 3 paintings : Colonel Colin MacKenzie, British Library, London (url)
- Tomás Hiepes (c. 1610–1674), 4 paintings : Garden View with a Dog, Museo del Prado, Madrid (url)
- Joseph Highmore (1692–1780), 2 paintings : Mr. Oldham and his Friends, Tate Gallery, London (url)
- Theodor Hildebrandt (1804–1874), 1 painting : Children Expecting the Christmas Feast, The Hermitage, St. Petersburg (url)
- Nicholas Hilliard (1537–1619), 1 painting : Portrait of Elizabeth I, Queen of England, National Portrait Gallery, London (url)
- Georg Hainz (1630–1700), 1 painting : Cabinet of Curiosities, Kunsthalle, Hamburg (url)
- George Hitchcock (1850–1913), 1 painting : The Bride, private collection (url)
- Meindert Hobbema (1638–1709), 20 paintings : The Avenue at Middelharnis, National Gallery, London (url)
- Ephraim Hochhauser (1691–1771), 1 painting : Self-Portrait at the Easel, Akademie der bildenden Künste, Vienna (url)
- William Hodges (1744–1797), 2 paintings : Tahiti Revisited, National Maritime Museum, London (url)
- Ferdinand Hodler (1853–1918), 2 paintings : Apple Tree in Blossom, Oskar Reinhart Collection, Winterthur (url)
- Gerard Hoet (1648–1733), 1 painting : Vertumnus and Pomona, The Hermitage, St. Petersburg (url)
- William Hogarth (1697–1764), 13 paintings : An Election Entertainment, Sir John Soane's Museum, London (url)
- Ambrosius Holbein (1497–1543), 1 painting : Portrait of a Young Man, The Hermitage, St. Petersburg (url)
- Hans Holbein the Elder (1460–1524), 2 paintings : Portrait of a Woman, Museo Thyssen-Bornemisza, Madrid (url)
- Hans Holbein the Younger (1497–1543), 63 paintings : Portrait of Bonifacius Amerbach, Kunstmuseum, Öffentliche Kunstsammlung, Basel (url)
- Frank Holl (1845–1888), 1 painting : No Tidings from the Sea, Royal Collection, Windsor (url)
- Simon Hollósy (1857–1918), 7 paintings : Corn Husking, Magyar Nemzeti Galéria, Budapest (url)
- Cornelis Holsteyn (1618–1658), 1 painting : Venus and Amor Mourning the Death of Adonis, Frans Halsmuseum, Haarlem (url)
- Winslow Homer (1836–1910), 4 paintings : Fog Warning, Museum of Fine Arts, Boston (url)
- Gijsbert d'Hondecoeter (1604–1653), 2 paintings : Fowl on a Riverbank, private collection (url)
- Gillis d'Hondecoeter (1575–1658), 4 paintings : Baptism of the Moorish Chamberlain, Rockox House, Antwerp (url)
- Melchior d'Hondecoeter (1636–1695), 10 paintings : Birds and a Spaniel in a Garden, Royal Collection, Windsor (url)
- Abraham Hondius (1631–1691), 2 paintings : Christ among the Doctors, Metropolitan Museum of Art, New York (url)
- Nathaniel Hone I (1718–1784), 2 paintings : General Lloyd, Fitzwilliam Museum, Cambridge (url)
- Gerard van Honthorst (1592–1656), 37 paintings : Samson and Delilah, Museum of Art, Cleveland (url)
- Pieter de Hooch (1629–1683), 43 paintings : The Empty Glass, Museum Boijmans Van Beuningen, Rotterdam (url)
- Samuel Dirksz van Hoogstraten (1627–1678), 14 paintings : The Anaemic Lady, Rijksmuseum, Amsterdam (url)
- John Hoppner (1758–1810), 2 paintings : Sir John Jeffreys Pratt, Staatliche Museen, Berlin (url)
- Jan Josef Horemans (1682–1759), 2 paintings : Operation, The Hermitage, St. Petersburg (url)
- Jan Josef Horemans II (1714–after 1790), 6 paintings : Concert in an Interior, Rockox House, Antwerp (url)
- Gerard Horenbout (1465–1541), 1 painting : Portraits of Lieven van Pottelsberghe and his Wife, Museum voor Schone Kunsten, Ghent (url)
- Lucas Horenbout (1455–1544), 1 painting : Henry VIII, Art Gallery of South Australia, Adelaide (url)
- Blanche Hoschedé Monet (1865–1947), 1 painting : Haystack, Effect of Snow, Fondation Claude Monet, Giverny (url)
- Michel-Ange Houasse (c. 1680–1730), 2 paintings : Bacchanal, Museo del Prado, Madrid (url)
- Arnold Houbraken (1660–1719), 2 paintings : Pallas Athene Visiting Apollo on the Parnassus, Dordrechts Museum, Dordrecht (url)
- Gerard Houckgeest (1600–1661), 7 paintings : Interior of the Nieuwe Kerk, Delft, with the Tomb of William the Silent, Kunsthalle, Hamburg (url)
- Jean Huber (1721–1786), 4 paintings : Voltaire Planting Trees, The Hermitage, St. Petersburg (url)
- Wolf Huber (1490–1553), 2 paintings : The Capture of Christ, Alte Pinakothek, Munich (url)
- Julius Hübner (1806–1882), 1 painting : Carl Friedrich Lessing, Carl Sohn, and Theodor Hildebrandt, Nationalgalerie, Berlin (url)
- Antonín Hudeček (1872–1941), 2 paintings : Quiet Evening, Národní Galerie, Prague (url) His name is spelled incorrectly on the Web Gallery.
- Thomas Hudson (1701–1779), 5 paintings : Portrait of a Lawyer, private collection (url)
- Christophe Huet (1700–1759), 7 paintings : Singerie: The Concert, National Gallery of Art, Washington (url)
- William John Huggins (1781–1845), 1 painting : The East Indiaman 'Ceres' in Two Positions off St. Helena, private collection (url)
- Pierre Nicolas Huilliot (1674–1751), 1 painting : Still-Life of Musical Instruments, Residenzgalerie, Salzburg (url)
- Jacob van Hulsdonck (1582–1647), 2 paintings : Still-Life of Flowers, private collection (url)
- Johann Erdmann Hummel (1769–1852), 3 paintings : Chess Players, Nationalgalerie, Berlin (url)
- William Holman Hunt (1827–1910), 5 paintings : The Awakening Conscience, Tate Gallery, London (url)
- William Morris Hunt (1824–1879), 1 painting : Niagara Falls, Williams College Museum of Art, Williamstown (url)
- Jacques Hupin (fl. mid-17th century), 1 painting : Still-life with Carpet, Civici Musei, Pavia (url)
- Pieter Huys (1519–1584), 1 painting : Temptation of St Anthony, Musée du Louvre, Paris (url)
- Cornelis Huysmans (1648–1727), 2 paintings : Forest Landscape, The Hermitage, St. Petersburg (url)
- Jan Baptist Huysmans (1654–1716), 1 painting : Mountain Landscape, private collection (url)
- Jan van Huysum (1682–1749), 13 paintings : Basket of Flowers, Alte Pinakothek, Munich (url)
- Justus van Huysum (1659–1716), 1 painting : Flowers, The Hermitage, St. Petersburg (url)

== I ==
- Julius Caesar Ibbetson (1759–1817), 2 paintings : George Biggins' Ascent in Lunardi' Balloon, Neue Pinakothek, Munich (url)
- Sinibaldo Ibi (1475–1550), 1 painting : Marriage of the Virgin, private collection (url)
- Gerolamo Induno (1827–1890), 2 paintings : Volunteer Defending Rome, Museo del Risorgimento, Milan (url)
- Jean Auguste Dominique Ingres (1780–1867), 28 paintings : Study of a Male Nude, École des Beaux-Arts, Paris (url)
- George Innes (1825–1894), 2 paintings : Summer Days, Museo Thyssen-Bornemisza, Madrid (url)
- Ignacio de Iriarte (1621–1670), 3 paintings : Landscape with Figures, Museo de Bellas Artes, Bilbao (url)
- Eugène Isabey (1803–1886), 3 paintings : Beach at Low Tide, Musée du Louvre, Paris (url)
- Adriaen Isenbrandt (1485–1551), 6 paintings : Mass of St Gregory, Museo del Prado, Madrid (url)
- Isaac Israëls (1865–1934), 1 painting : In the Dance Hall, Rijksmuseum Kröller-Müller, Otterlo (url)
- Jozef Israëls (1824–1911), 2 paintings : We Grow Old, Haags Gemeentemuseum, The Hague (url)
- Franz Ittenbach (1813–1879), 2 paintings : Portrait of Dr. Franz Xavier von Soist, Museum of Fine Arts, Boston (url)
- Béla Iványi-Grünwald (1867–1940), 9 paintings : The Warlord's Sword, Magyar Nemzeti Galéria, Budapest (url)

== J ==
- Gilbert Jackson (1621–1640), 1 painting : Portrait of Jane, Countess of Winchester, private collection (url)
- Dirck Jacobsz. (1497–1567), 5 paintings : A Group of Guardsmen of the Amsterdam Kloveniersdoelen, Rjksmuseum, Amsterdam (url)
- Lambert Jacobsz (1598–1636), 1 painting : Joseph's Brothers on the Road from Egypt, private collection (url)
- Jacometto Veneziano (fl. 1472 – 1497), 3 paintings : Alvise Contarini, Portrait of a Woman, Metropolitan Museum of Art, New York (url)
- Jacopo da Empoli (c. 1554 – 1640), 8 paintings : The Honesty of Eligius, Galleria degli Uffizi, Florence (url)
- Jacopo da Sellaio (c. 1441 – 1493), 2 paintings : Saint John the Baptist, National Gallery of Art, Washington (url)
- Claudius Jacquand (1803–1878), 1 painting : The Count of Comminges Recognizing Adélaide, Musée des Beaux-Arts, Rennes (url)
- Charles Jacque (1813–1894), 2 paintings : Landscape with a Herd, The Hermitage, St. Petersburg (url)
- Franz Christoph Janneck (1703–1761), 5 paintings : Elegant Company in an Interior, private collection (url)
- Abraham Janssens (1570–1632), 2 paintings : Scaldis and Antwerpia, Koninklijk Museum voor Schone Kunsten, Antwerp (url)
- Hieronymus Janssens (1624–1693), 1 painting : The Ball, The Hermitage, St. Petersburg (url)
- Jan Janssens (1665), 1 painting : The Annunciation, Museum voor Schone Kunsten, Ghent (url)
- Victor Honoré Janssens (1658–1736), 2 paintings : Io Recognised by Her Father, private collection (url)
- Marie-Victoire Jaquotot (1772–1855), 2 paintings : Napoleon in Coronation Robes, Fondation Napoleon, Paris (url)
- Eero Järnefelt (1863–1937), 1 painting : Lefranc the Wine Merchant, Boulevard Clichy, Paris, Atheneumin Taidemuseo, Helsinki (url)
- Étienne Jeaurat (1699–1789), 1 painting : Recovering, The Hermitage, St. Petersburg (url)
- Christian Albrecht Jensen (1792–1870), 2 paintings : Portrait of a Lady in Blue Dress, The Hermitage, St. Petersburg (url)
- Charles Jervas (c. 1675 – 1739), 1 painting : Deer, Dog and Cat, The Hermitage, St. Petersburg (url)
- Luis Jiménez Aranda (1845–1928), 1 painting : A Lady at the Paris World Fair, Meadows Museum and Gallery, Southern Methodist University, Dallas (url)
- Viggo Johansen (1851–1935), 1 painting : Near Skagen Østerby after a Storm, Skagens Museum, Skagen (url)
- Antonio Joli (c. 1700 – 1777), 6 paintings : Arrival of Charles III in Naples, Museo del Prado, Madrid (url)
- Thomas Jones (1742–1803), 3 paintings : Houses in Naples, British Museum, London (url)
- Ludolf Leendertsz de Jongh (1616–1679), 4 paintings : Scene in a Courtyard, Metropolitan Museum of Art, New York (url)
- Johan Jongkind (1819–1891), 6 paintings : View of Overschie, Musée de la Chartreuse, Douai (url)
- Cornelis Janssens van Ceulen (1593–1661), 4 paintings : Sir Thomas Lucy and his Family, Charlecote Park, Warwickshire (url)
- Cornelis Janson van Ceulen II (1634–1715), 3 paintings : Portrait of a Man with a Watch, Metropolitan Museum of Art, New York (url)
- Justus van Gent (1430–1490), 7 paintings : Allegory of Music, National Gallery, London (url)
- Hans III Jordaens (1590–1643), 3 paintings : The Israelites after Crossing the Red Sea, The Hermitage, St. Petersburg (url)
- Jacob Jordaens (1593–1678), 49 paintings : The Bean King, Kunsthistorisches Museum, Vienna (url)
- Pio Joris (1843–1921), 1 painting : The Fruit Vendor, Galleria dell'Arte Moderna, Palazzo Pitti, Florence (url)
- Ernst Josephson (1851–1906), 1 painting : Autumn Sunlight, Thielska Galleriet, Stockholm (url)
- Isaac de Jouderville (1612–1646), 1 painting : Bust of a Young Man, National Gallery of Ireland, Dublin (url)
- Jean Jouvenet (1644–1717), 6 paintings : Descent from the Cross, Musée du Louvre, Paris (url)
- Juan de Flandes (1465–1519), 18 paintings : Carrying the Cross, Cathedral, Palencia (url)
- Juan de Juanes (c. 1523 – 1579), 4 paintings : The Last Supper, Museo del Prado, Madrid (url)
- Jens Juel (1745–1802), 3 paintings : Portrait of a Woman, The Hermitage, St. Petersburg (url)

== K ==
- Willem Kalf (1619–1693), 14 paintings : Interior of a Kitchen, Metropolitan Museum of Art, New York (url)
- Angelica Kauffman (1741–1807), 9 paintings : Ariadne Abandoned by Theseus on Naxos, Gemäldegalerie, Dresden (url)
- Wilhelm von Kaulbach (1804–1874), 2 paintings : The Destruction of Jerusalem by Titus, Neue Pinakothek, Munich (url)
- Bernhard Keil (1624–1687), 6 paintings : Boy Warming himself over Embers, Akademie der bildenden Künste, Vienna (url)
- Alexander Keirincx (1600–1652), 3 paintings : Forest Scene, Národní Galerie, Prague (url)
- John Frederick Kensett (1816–1872), 1 painting : Lake George, Museo Thyssen-Bornemisza, Madrid (url)
- Jaques van de Kerckhove (1636–1712), 1 painting : Still-Life, private collection (url)
- Anton Kern (1709–1747), 2 paintings : Summer and Spring, The Hermitage, St. Petersburg (url)
- Frederick Kerseboom (1632–1693), 1 painting : Portrait of Sir John Langham as a Boy, private collection (url)
- Georg Friedrich Kersting (1785–1847), 6 paintings : Caspar David Friedrich in his Studio, Nationalgalerie, Berlin (url)
- Jan van Kessel (1641–1680), 1 painting : River Landscape, private collection (url)
- Jan van Kessel, senior (1626–1679), 28 paintings : The Animals, Museo del Prado, Madrid (url)
- Cornelis Ketel (1548–1616), 1 painting : Double Portrait of a Brother and Sister, Museum Mayer van den Bergh, Antwerp (url)
- Kerstiaen de Keuninck (1560–1632), 3 paintings : Landscape with Actaeon and Diana, Koninklijk Museum voor Schone Kunsten, Antwerp (url)
- Adriaen Thomasz Key (1544–1589), 5 paintings : Portrait of a Man, Groeninge Museum, Bruges (url)
- Willem Key (1515–1568), 2 paintings : Portrait of Ferdinand Alvarez de Toledo, Rijksmuseum, Amsterdam (url)
- Thomas de Keyser (1596–1667), 15 paintings : The Militia Company of Captain Allaert Cloeck, Rijksmuseum, Amsterdam (on loan) (url)
- Cornelis Kick (1603–1652), 2 paintings : Still-Life with Silver Cup, private collection (url)
- Simon Kick (1603–1652), 2 paintings : Portrait of a Young Man, The Hermitage, St. Petersburg (url)
- François Kinson (1771–1839), 5 paintings : Portrait of Jeanne Bauwens-van Peteghem, Groeninge Museum, Bruges (url)
- Bálint Kiss (1802–1868), 2 paintings : Portrait of a Thegn, Déri Museum, Debrecen (url)
- Leo von Klenze (1784–1864), 1 painting : The Acropolis at Athens, Neue Pinakothek, Munich (url)
- Max Klinger (1857–1920), 1 painting : The Colosseum in Rome, Staatliche Kunstsammlungen, Dresden (url)
- Godfrey Kneller (1646–1723), 3 paintings : The Chinese Convert, Royal Collection, Windsor (url)
- Wouter Knijff (1605–1694), 2 paintings : River Landscape, private collection (url)
- Martin Knoller (1725–1804), 1 painting : Assumption of the Virgin, Musée du Louvre, Paris (url)
- Nikolaus Knüpfer (1609–1655), 4 paintings : Brothel Scene, Rijksmuseum, Amsterdam (url)
- Jacob Knijff (1639–1681), 1 painting : An English Ship and other Shipping off Castle Cornet, Guernsey, private collection (url)
- Franz Kobell (1749–1822), 1 painting : River Landscape with Travelers, private collection (url)
- Hendrik Kobell (1751–1779), 1 painting : The Shipwreck, Riksmuseum, Twenthe (url)
- Jan Kobell (1778–1814), 1 painting : Extensive River Landscape, private collection (url)
- Wilhelm von Kobell (1766–1853), 3 paintings : The Siege of Cosel, Neue Pinakothek, Munich (url)
- Christen Købke (1810–1848), 4 paintings : Portrait of Adolphine Købke, Sister of the Artist, Musée du Louvre, Paris (url)
- Joseph Anton Koch (1768–1839), 6 paintings : Heroic Landscape with Rainbow, Neue Pinakothek, Munich (url)
- Isaac Koedijck (1618–1668), 1 painting : Man in an Interior, private collection (url)
- Barend Cornelis Koekkoek (1803–1862), 1 painting : Winter landscape, Rijksmuseum, Amsterdam (url)
- Johann Koerbecke (c. 1420 – 1490), 1 painting : Assumption of the Virgin, Museo Thyssen-Bornemisza, Madrid (url)
- Roelof Koets (1592–1654), 3 paintings : Still-Life with Fish, Brooks Museum of Art, Memphis (url)
- Christian Kollonitsch (1730–1802), 1 painting : Portrait of Anton Franz de Paula, Count Lamberg-Sprinzenstein, Akademie der bildenden Künste, Vienna (url)
- Johann König (1586–1642), 3 paintings : The Death of Niobe's Children, private collection (url)
- Philips Koninck (1619–1688), 12 paintings : Dutch Landscape Viewed from the Dunes, Gemäldegalerie, Dresden (url)
- Salomon Koninck (1609–1656), 3 paintings : Parable of the Workers in the Vineyard, The Hermitage, St. Petersburg (url)
- August Kopisch (1799–1853), 1 painting : The Pontine Marshes at Sunset, Nationalgalerie, Berlin (url)
- Konstantin Korovin (1861–1939), 2 paintings : Café in Paris, State Tretyakov Gallery, Moscow (url)
- Johann Lucas Kracker (1719–1779), 4 paintings : Saint John of Nepomuk, Bishopric Seminary, Eger (url)
- David von Krafft (1780–1856), 7 paintings : Portrait of Count Ferenc Barkóczy, Historical Picture Gallery, Hungarian National Museum, Budapest (url)
- Per Krafft the Elder (1724–1793), 1 painting : Portrait of Natalia Alexandrovna Repnina, The Hermitage, St. Petersburg (url)
- Nils Kreuger (1858–1930), 2 paintings : Gypsy on Öland, Malmö Museer, Malmö (url)
- Joseph Kreutzinger (1751–1829), 2 paintings : Portrait of Ferenc Kazinczy, Hungarian Academy of Sciences, Budapest (url)
- Christian Krohg (1852–1925), 4 paintings : Portrait of the Artist Karl Nordström at Grèz, Nasjonalgalleriet, Oslo (url)
- Peder Severin Krøyer (1851–1909), 4 paintings : Artists at Breakfast, Skagens Museum, Skagen (url)
- Franz Krüger (1797–1857), 8 paintings : Equestrian Portrait of Alexander I, The Hermitage, St. Petersburg (url)
- Hans Süß von Kulmbach (c. 1480 – 1522), 1 painting : The Calling of St Peter, Galleria degli Uffizi, Florence (url)
- Pieter Cornelisz Kunst (1484–1561), 1 painting : Scenes from the Life of St. Anthony Abbot, Stedelijk Museum De Lakenhal, Leiden (url)
- Jan Kupecký (1667–1740), 6 paintings : Self-Portrait, Szépmûvészeti Múzeum, Budapest (url)
- Vilhelm Kyhn (1819–1903), 1 painting : Young Boy Seated on a Wall Overlooking Capri, private collection (url)

== See also ==
- List of sculptors in the Web Gallery of Art
- List of graphic artists in the Web Gallery of Art
