= Kurt Martin =

German art historian (1899–1975)

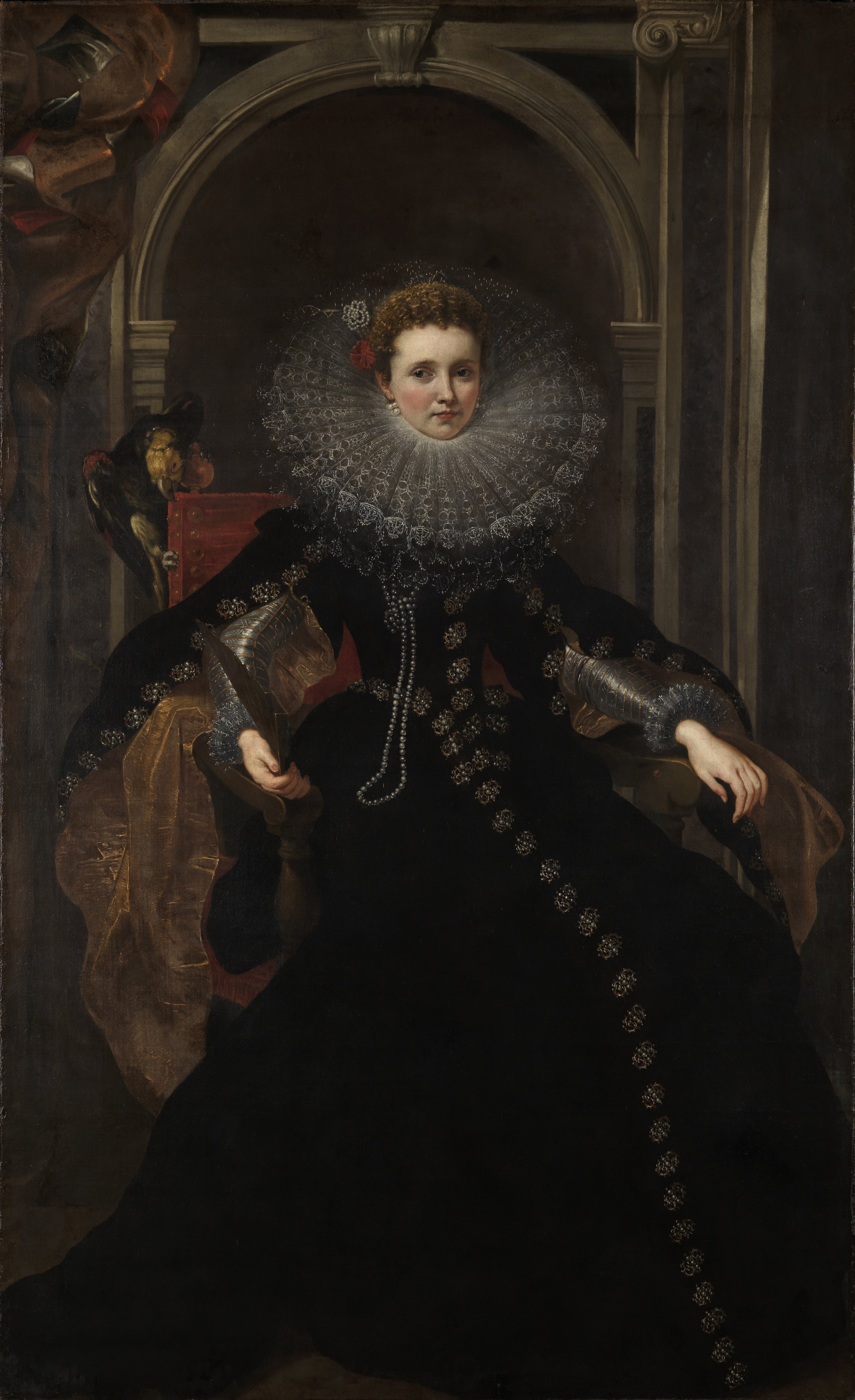
Rubens' Portrait of Marchesa Brigida Spinola Doria, 1935, bought from van Diemen & Co., Berlin

Kurt Martin (31 January 1899 – 27 January 1975) was a German art historian. His career began in 1927 as curator of the Baden State Museum Karlsruhe. From 1934 to 1956, he was director of the Staatlichen Kunsthalle Karlsruhe (National Art Gallery Karlsruhe). In 1940 he was appointed Head of the Municipal Museums of Strasbourg as well as Chief Commissioner of the Alsatian Museums. In 1956 he became Director of the Karlsruher Kunstakademie (Academy of Art Karlsruhe), and in 1957 General Director of the Bayerischen Staatsgemäldesammlungen (Bavarian State Painting Collection). He was also a professor of art history.

== Early life and education ==
Kurt Martin was born on 31 January 1899 in Zürich, Switzerland, the third son of Rudolf Martin (1864–1925), professor of anthropology from Baden, and his wife Anna Hein (1865–1940). In Zürich, he attended elementary school before changing to the École Nouvelle in Lausanne and later to a secondary school in Karlsruhe. There he passed his Abitur (final secondary school examinations) in 1917.

He served as a soldier in World War I.

In 1920 he started his philosophy studies (among others with Martin Heidegger and Edmund Husserl) and majored in art history (with Hans Jantzen) at the University of Freiburg. He completed his art studies in 1924 at the Ludwig-Maximilians-Universität München with Heinrich Wölfflin (1864–1945) with his PhD thesis on the subject of "Die Nürnberger Steinplastik im 14. Jahrhundert" (The Nuremberger Effigy in the 14th century).

== Career ==
=== 1927–1934: Mannheim and Baden State Museum ===
Martin started his career in 1927 as a volunteer at the Kunsthalle Mannheim (Art Gallery Mannheim) with Gustav Friedrich Hartlaub. Soon he was appointed research assistant and subsequently curator at the Badisches Landesmuseum (Baden State Museum), Karlsruhe. In 1931 he addressed himself to the task of organizing the exhibition "German Poets as Painters and Drawers" for the Kunstverein (art society) Heidelberg.

=== Badisches Armeemuseum ===
In the early 1930s Martin met Robert Wagner, a confidant of Adolf Hitler and NSDAP politician with whom Martin would have to do until 1945.

In the autumn of 1933 Wagner commissioned Martin with the development and organization of an army museum of Baden. Together with the retired Colonel Erich Blankenhorn, who had just been dismissed as chief of the Badische Landespolizei (State Police of Baden) by the new rulers, he built up an independent museum under the aegis of the Baden State Museum Karlsruhe (Badisches Landesmuseum), called Badisches Armeemuseum (Army Museum of Baden) For this purpose premises were made available in the former stables of the Karlsruhe Palace, the residence of the State museum. On 13 May 1934 Robert Wagner and Kurt Martin inaugurated the museum with 80.000 guests and two days of celebration. Besides departments of the army of the Reich (Reichswehr) and color guards of the military associations, a row of delegations of NS-organizations, including SA, SS and Reich Labor Service (Reichsarbeitsdienst), marched up in the demilitarized zone.

In his opening speech from the balcony of the palace, Martin declared that the museum had benefited from over one thousand donations of military antiques. The museum was not only supposed to include the regiments of Baden, but also the regiments of the earlier 15th Alsatian army corps. The museum was supposed to be a "speaking memorial, teaching everyone the military-political achievements of our frontier people. [...] Here the youth shall learn to respect and understand the achievements of their fathers." Wagner said about the purposes of the museum: "What is given to the public today in the shape of the Army Museum is nothing else than an intellectual legacy from a time of struggling and fighting for our Germany for the struggle and fight for our Germany." In reality, the exhibition was nothing more than a "Potemkin village". Erich Blankenhorn commented on the state of the museum on the date of the opening and said that due to the short preparation period "it was only possible to decorate the first royal stables with historically incoherent paintings and objects." For that reason the museum was closed one day after the opening.

=== 1934: Staatliche Kunsthalle Karlsruhe (National Art Gallery Karlsruhe) ===
On 2 July 1934 Wagner appointed Martin head of the Staatliche Kunsthalle Karlsruhe (National Art Gallery Karlsruhe). He succeeded Hans Adolf Bühler, who was loyal to the party line and whose management of the museum was characterized by a radical opposition to the so-called degenerate art. Martin remained head of the Staatliche Kunsthalle until 1956.

=== Exhibitions 1934–1940 ===
Between 1934 and 1939 the Staatliche Kunsthalle was limited in its activities. In the years between 1934 and 1937 the orangery building of the botanical garden was remodeled in order to accommodate a special department for the Baden paintings of the late 19th and 20th century as from 1938. Since 1934 the department of the old German Masterpieces had been reorganized. It was reopened to the public in 1937. Finally, the also redesigned department of the Dutch and Flemish painters reopened as well.

Between 1934 and 1937 several exhibitions were organized in the gallery of prints, including an exhibition about Hans Thoma in 1934 and an exhibition of the most recent acquisitions of old German masterpieces by the Staatliche Kunsthalle in 1936.

Furthermore, two travelling exhibitions were organized for the elementary schools in Baden. In 1936 an exhibition about Hans Thoma was shown in 55 locations and totaled about 90.000 visitors, and in 1937 an exhibition about Albrecht Dürer was shown in 25 locations and registered about 45.000 visitors.

Between 1934 and 1937 the Staatliche Kunsthalle organized annually, among others, about forty tours for the Reichsarbeitsdienst (Reichs Labor Service), the organization "Kraft durch Freude" (KdF) (Strength Through Joy), the NS-Frauenschaft (Nazi women’s organization), the sisterhood of the Red Cross and schools.

Just before the beginning of the war, on 2 July 1939, the museum was reopened and back in full operation. At the same time the Kunsthalle celebrated its 100th anniversary. On this occasion Robert Wagner opened a memorial exhibition for Hans Thoma showing 180 works. Besides private collectors and galleries, the Nationalgalerie (National Gallery) in Berlin, the Hamburger Kunsthalle (Art Gallery Hamburg) and the Städtische Galerie Frankfurt (Municipal Gallery Frankfurt) contributed to this exhibition with loans. Martin meant to present Thoma as "a master of the German landscape and as a great portraitist". At the same time the newly renovated "Feuerbachsaal" was reopened to the public. It contained the German paintings of the 19th century that had been "rearranged". The state government of Baden donated a work of Trübner, and the city of Karlsruhe a work of Thoma.

From 1940 on, the Kunsthalle remained closed.

=== Art acquisitions in general ===
Between 1934 and 1937 the Kunsthalle acquired 115 paintings under the direction of Martin, including works of Hans Thoma, Emil Lugo and Hermann Daur.

From 1938 to 1939 the Kunsthalle acquired 53 paintings. Martin emphasized paintings of Wilhelm Trübner, Anselm Feuerbach and Hans Thoma in his account report. Among the works that were marked as "transfers" were paintings by Karl Buchholz, Hermann Burte, Joseph Fratrel and Adolph von Menzel. At the same time the Kunsthalle acquired 175 drawings, 636 graphic print works and four sketchbooks. Regarding the drawings, Martin emphasized eight sheets by Ferdinand Kobell, three by Franz Kobell and nine by Wilhelm Trübner, as well as – a gift of the NSDAP-Gauleitung of Baden – the "valuable early drawing of Hans Thoma, Schönau im Wiesental (Schönau in the valley of Wiesen)".

In 1940, the collection of the Staatliche Kunsthalle Karlsruhe "was enriched by a few works mainly by artists from Baden". For example, the museum acquired paintings from Albert Lang, Fritz Boehle, Ferdinand Keller, Ernst Württemberger, and Eduard Hunziker, and several drawings by Hans Thoma and Ferdinand Keller.

In his activities report for the year 1940, Martin wrote: "The General Administration managed to accomplish a few essential acquisitions for the public museums which will be reported about later in context."

=== Art acquisition from Jewish collections ===
The Kunsthalle Karlsruhe continuously took over art works from originally Jewish property. In a statement from 1947, Martin listed about 100 works, including works from the collections of Richard Lenel, Mannheim (one work), Benno Weil, Mannheim (one work), Siegfried Reiss, Mannheim (44 works), Arthur Levis, Karlsruhe (one work), E. Reiss, Heidelberg (three works), Paul Homburger, Karlsruhe (three works), Ettlinger, Karlsruhe (one work), Klara Goldschmit, Karlsruhe, Salomon, Karlsruhe (one work), Ernst Gallinek, Baden Baden (16 works and a porcelain collection including more than 400 objects) and Violetta von Waldberg, Heidelberg (wife of Max von Waldberg) (four works). The Kunsthalle took over these works from other State authorities that had expropriated the previous owners. Most of the works mentioned by Martin were transferred to the Kunsthalle from authorities, partly against payment. The Kunsthalle acquired 20 works on its own initiative from an "Auction Sale of Jewish Property 6th–9th August 1941 in Karlsruhe".

In 1935, Kurt Martin acquired the work Portrait of the Marchesa Veronica Spinola Doria by Peter Paul Rubens for 63.000 Reichsmark at the liquidation auction of the Gallery van Diemen & Co. GmbH. In the 1950s the Kunsthalle Karlsruhe paid compensation to the heirs of the Jewish gallery directors. In 2000 a new compensation was claimed without success. This acquisition was not mentioned in the report for the years 1934 until 1937.

=== 1940 – 1944: "Oberrheinische" museums ("Upper Rhine" museums) ===
With the occupation of Alsatia, Robert Wagner became chief of the Alsatian Civilian Administration and had complete political freedom. It was his main objective to ensure that Alsatia become "German" again, in particular that Strasbourg become the "preeminent first cultural center of the German Reich". He pursued this goal in the performing arts by founding several theatres and establishing German libraries. Moreover, he prohibited the use of the French language in public and Germanized all toponyms.

Kurt Martin was responsible for the museums and helped Wagner prepare his "vision of a cultural model-district Alsatia-Baden".

=== State representative for the museums in Alsatia ===
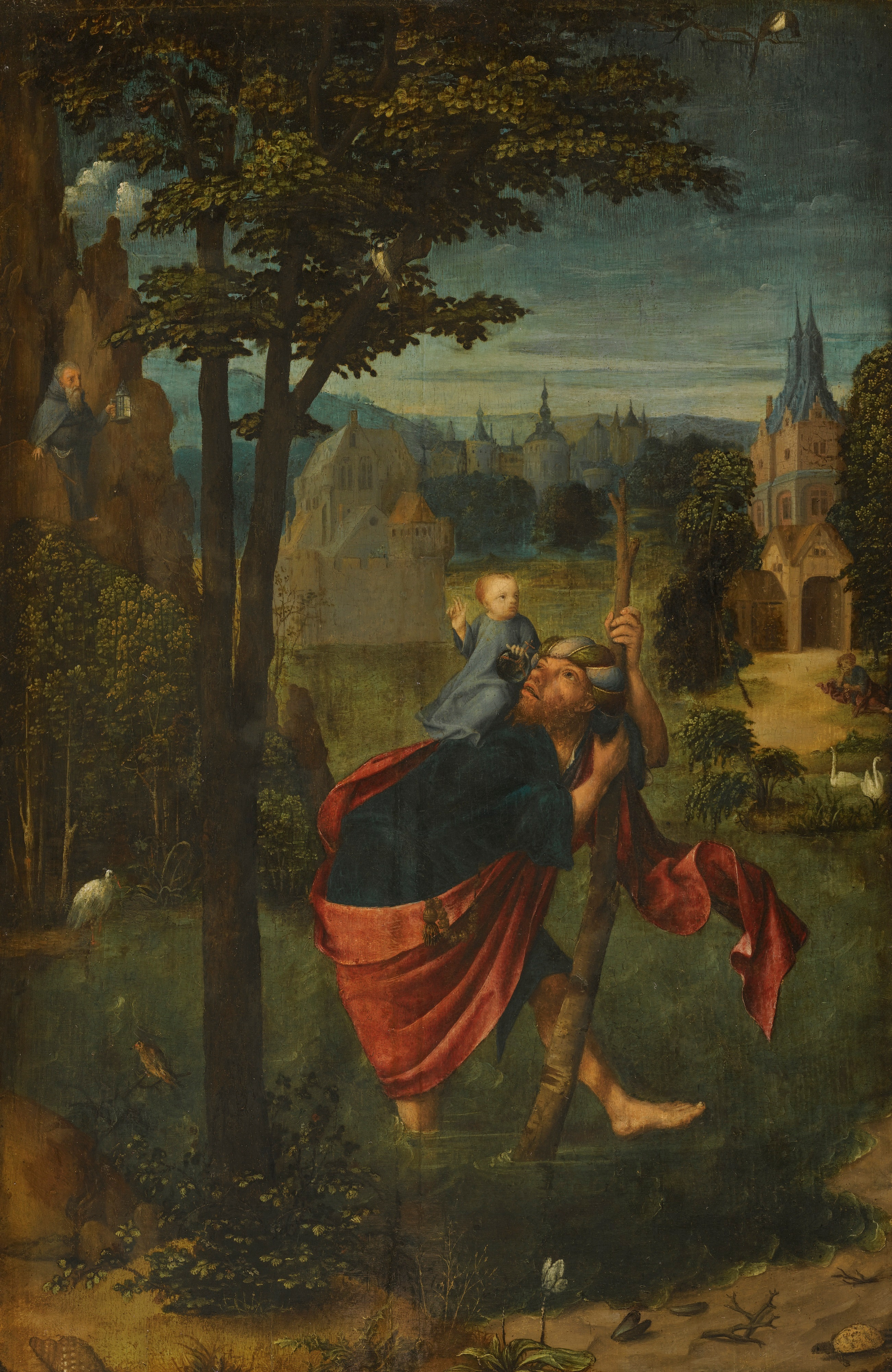
NK 2556: Master of Frankfurt – St. Christopherus, 1942, bought from Paul Cassirer, Amsterdam

On 17 November 1940, as "State Representative for the Museums in Alsatia", Martin describes the initial situation in Strasbourg in the light of the new political realities in an article about the future of the museums in "our land at the Upper Rhine": In the city, the Palais Rohan and the Frauenhausmuseum unite the architecture of the Middle Ages and the 18th century in a "unique way in Germany". This unity is also reflected in the museums' inventories. Martin aimed especially at the development of museums as places of national education with a regional and local focus.

With this scope in mind, Martin aimed at the expansion of the Strasbourg collection "on European grounds". He wanted to develop the collection as a collection of European significance.

=== Director of the Municipal Museums of Strasbourg and Chief Commissioner of the Upper Rhine Museums ===
At the instigation of Wagner, Martin became director of the Municipal Museums of Strasbourg. He also kept his position in Karlsruhe. As of 1 April 1941 he became the Director of the General Administration of the Upper Rhine Museums, thus of all museums in Baden and Alsatia.

=== Art purchased in the Netherlands ===
From 1941 to 1944, Martin purchased about 40 paintings and a series of other objet d'arts in the Netherlands. Some works with Dutch provenance, which Martin purchased, are part of the Dutch art collection (NK Collection) today; see list below.

=== OSS Art Looting Intelligence Unit Red Flag list ===
In 1946, Martin was investigated for his role in acquiring art from Nazi-occupied areas for German museums and placed on the "Red Flag" list. The entries concerning him were mixed, featuring both a reputation for integrity and suspicions that he was playing a "double game" concerning Nazi-looted art.

=== Post-War period ===
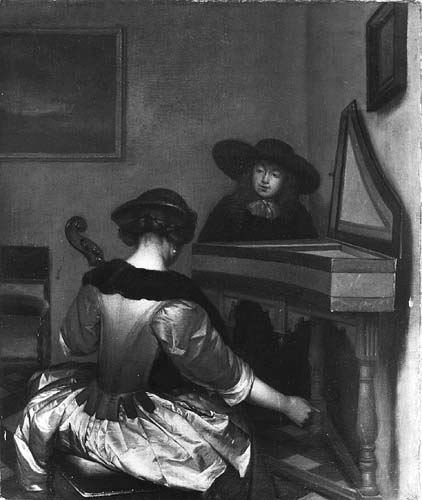
NK 2740: ter Borch (previously attributed to) – Music lesson, 1942, purchased of the Dienststelle Mühlmann

Kurt Martin was able to reintegrate his position as director of the Staatliche Kunsthalle Karlsruhe immediately in the summer of 1945, especially because Walter W. Horn, officers from the French Art Protection and his former French colleagues from Strasbourg confirmed his great integrity and qualification. Martin supported the French and American authorities in locating and rescuing the artworks that had been stored for purposes of protection during wartime.

In 1946 he co-founded the International Council of Museums and remained director of the German National Committee for 15 years. From 1948 until shortly before his death in 1975, he was a member of the administrative board of the Germanic National Museum in Nuremberg. In 1947 he was already able to exhibit masterpieces of the museum in St. Gall. In 1951 he reopened the museum in Karlsruhe. He added a pedagogical department to the museum, which was a novel idea at the time. In 1948 he curated an exhibition of German art for the Federal Foreign Office, which was shown in several cities in the United States. In 1950 he organized the exhibition Des maîtres de Cologne à Albrecht Dürer showing works of old German masters in Paris. He initiated the exhibition German watercolors, drawings and prints: A midcentury review, which was shown by the German government in the US in 1956. Martin was one of the co-founders of the documenta in Kassel, an exhibition for contemporary art that took place for the first in time 1956. He was a member of the documenta-council for many years.

In 1956 he became director of the Academy of Art Karlsruhe. In 1957 he transferred to Munich, succeeding Ernst Buchner in the General Direction of the Bayerische Staatsgemäldesammlungen (Bavarian State Painting Collections). He retired in 1964. In Munich, Martin was responsible for the establishment of several museum branches in different cities in Bavaria. He also promoted the extension of the Munich Museum collections to contemporary art works.

== Recognition ==
According to the Metzler Dictionary of Art Historians, Martin was one of the leading museum directors of his time.

In 1963 he received the Bavarian Order of Merit and in 1964 he was appointed to Dr.-Ing. e.h. by the TH Karlsruhe.

== Personal life ==
Martin was a Protestant. He married medical doctor Hildegard Wangrin in 1928.

== List of art purchased in the Netherlands ==
In the database of the NK Collection, the following purchases of Martin are listed:

Artist	Title	NK-number	Art dealer	POS	YOS	FN
Replica by Francesco Guardi	Capriccio	NK1613	D. A. Hoogendijk & Co.	Amsterdam	1943
Anonymous (previously attributed to J. van der Venne)	Baptism of Christ	NK1617	D. A. Hoogendijk & Co.	Amsterdam	1942
Gillis van Coninxloo	Still life of flowers	NK1801	H. Rudolph	Berlin	1942
Jan van Goyen	Winter landscape	NK1820	P. de Boer	Amsterdam	1943
Frans van Schooten	Still life with pewter jug, prawns and cheeses	NK1875	H. Abels	Köln	1940
Daniel Vosmaer	Landscape with manor	NK1986	P. de Boer	Amsterdam	1942
Oskar Kokoschka	Still life with fish on the beach	NK2372	Paul Cassirer	Amsterdam	1943
Bernhard Strigel	The descent from the Cross	NK2500	D. A. Hoogendijk & Co.	Amsterdam	1942
Jan Anthoniszoon van Ravesteyn	Portrait of a woman	NK2527	N. Beets	Amsterdam	since 1940
Gerard ter Borch	A couple making music	NK2740	Dienststelle Mühlmann	Den Haag	1942
Abraham van Calraet	Landscape with riders	NK2436	Kurt Walter Bachstitz	Den Haag	1943
Meester van Frankfurt	St. Christopher	NK2556	Paul Cassirer	–	1942
B. Averkamp	Winter landscape with skaters	NK2482	M.J. Schiltman	Den Haag	?
Peter Binoit	Still life with grapes	NK1619	P. de Boer	Amsterdam	1941
Jan van Goyen	Fortifications and church along a river	NK2614	D. Katz	Dieren	?
Adrian Thomas Key	Portrait of a man	NK2627	D. A. Hoogendijk & Co.	Amsterdam	1942
Anonymous (previously attributed to Meester van Kappenburg)	The circumcision	NK1614	J. Dik	Amsterdam	1942
Roelant Savery	Landscape with ruins and animals	NK2478	Paul Cassirer	Amsterdam	1942
Gerard ter Borch	Cornelis de Graeff	NK2925	E. Plietzsch	Den Haag/Berlin	1944
Anonymus (possibly Elias Vonck)	A country girl from West Frisia	NK1616	Paul Cassirer	Amsterdam	1942
P. de Vos	A boar attacked by hounds	NK2418	P. de Boer	Amsterdam	1942
Peter Binoit	Flowers still life with nuts, fruit and a mouse	NK1615	Galerie Matthiessen	Berlin	1943
Jan Siberechts	Two shepherds's boys, cows and sheep at a drinking place	NK1618	C. Th. F. Thurkow	–	1942
Willem Kalff	Still life with Chinese bowl and high gilt cup	NK2491	M. J. Schiltman	Amsterdam	since 1940
Jan van der Heyden	View of a Dutch town	NK2441	P. de Boer	Amsterdam	1942
