= Kobell =

Kobell (Surname) may refer to:

- Ferdinand Kobell (1740–1799), German painter and engraver
- Franz Kobell (1749–1822), German painter, etcher, and draftsman
- Hendrik Kobell (1751–1779), Dutch landscape and marine painter, etcher, draftsman, and watercolorist
- Jan Kobell (1779–1814), Dutch animal and landscape painter
- Wilhelm von Kobell (1766–1853), German painter, printmaker, and teacher
- Wolfgang Franz von Kobell (1803–1882), German mineralogist, inventor, writer, and poet
