= Lenel =

Lenel is a surname of German origin. Notable people with this surname include:

- Otto Lenel (1849–1935), German Jewish jurist and legal historian
- Ludwig Lenel (1914–2002), German organist and composer
- Richard Lenel (1869–1950), German businessman
- Victor Lenel (1838-1917), German businessman
