= Verhelst =

Verhelst is a surname. Notable people with this surname include:

- Ann Verhelst (born 1959), also known as Ann Demeulemeester, Belgian fashion designer
- Egid Verhelst the Elder (1696–1749), Southern Netherlandish court sculptor
- Egid Verhelst the Younger (1733–1804), German artist, son of the above
- Louis Verhelst (born 1990), Belgian cyclist
- Peter Verhelst (born 1962), Belgian writer
