= Hendrik Kobell =

Dutch painter

- Born: 13 September 1751; Rotterdam, Dutch Republic
- Died: 3 August 1779 (aged 27)
- Known for: Landscape, marine painting and etching
- Children: Jan Kobell II

Hendrik Kobell (13 September 1751 – 3 August 1779) was a Dutch painter who specialised in landscape painting and marine art.

== Biography ==
He came from a painting family and was a cousin of Ferdinand Kobell and Franz Kobell, German painters and brothers. His father was a pottery merchant, and though he was not a professional artist, he trained his son in drawing, who loved to draw ships in the port of Rotterdam. The younger Kobell was finally able to take a journey in one when his father arranged some business he could attend to in London in 1769. There he conducted his business while drawing all sorts of ships and boats, and when he returned to the Northern Netherlands in 1770, he gave up the pottery business to study art in Amsterdam. He studied for two years under Jacob de Vos and Cornelis Ploos van Amstel with such success that he was elected a member of the Stadstekenacademie (Amsterdam drawing academy). He travelled to Paris in 1772 and in 1772 settled in Rotterdam, where he helped set up a similar drawing academy; Genootschap Hierdoor tot Hooger.

He was the father and teacher of the painter Jan Kobell II (1778–1814), and his other pupils were Carel Frederik Bendorp, and Gerrit van der Pals.

== Works ==
He painted in oils and watercolors, doing landscapes and marines. His work is distinguished by skillful manipulation and lifelike depiction. His work as a draftsman and etcher was also notable. He was esteemed for his numerous drawings, executed in pen and heightened with India ink.

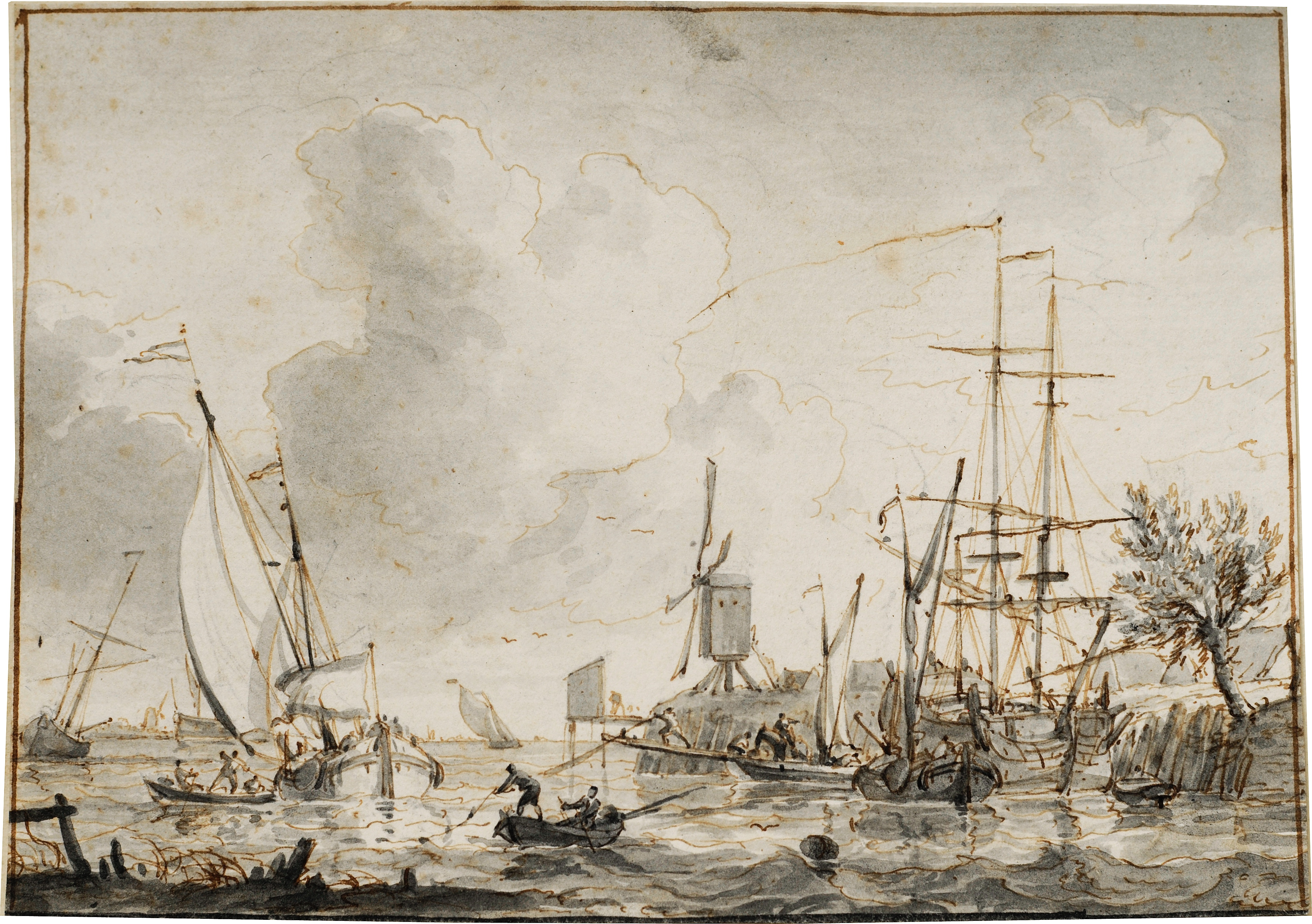
Ships and boats along the coast in the Dortse Kil, c. 1772/73

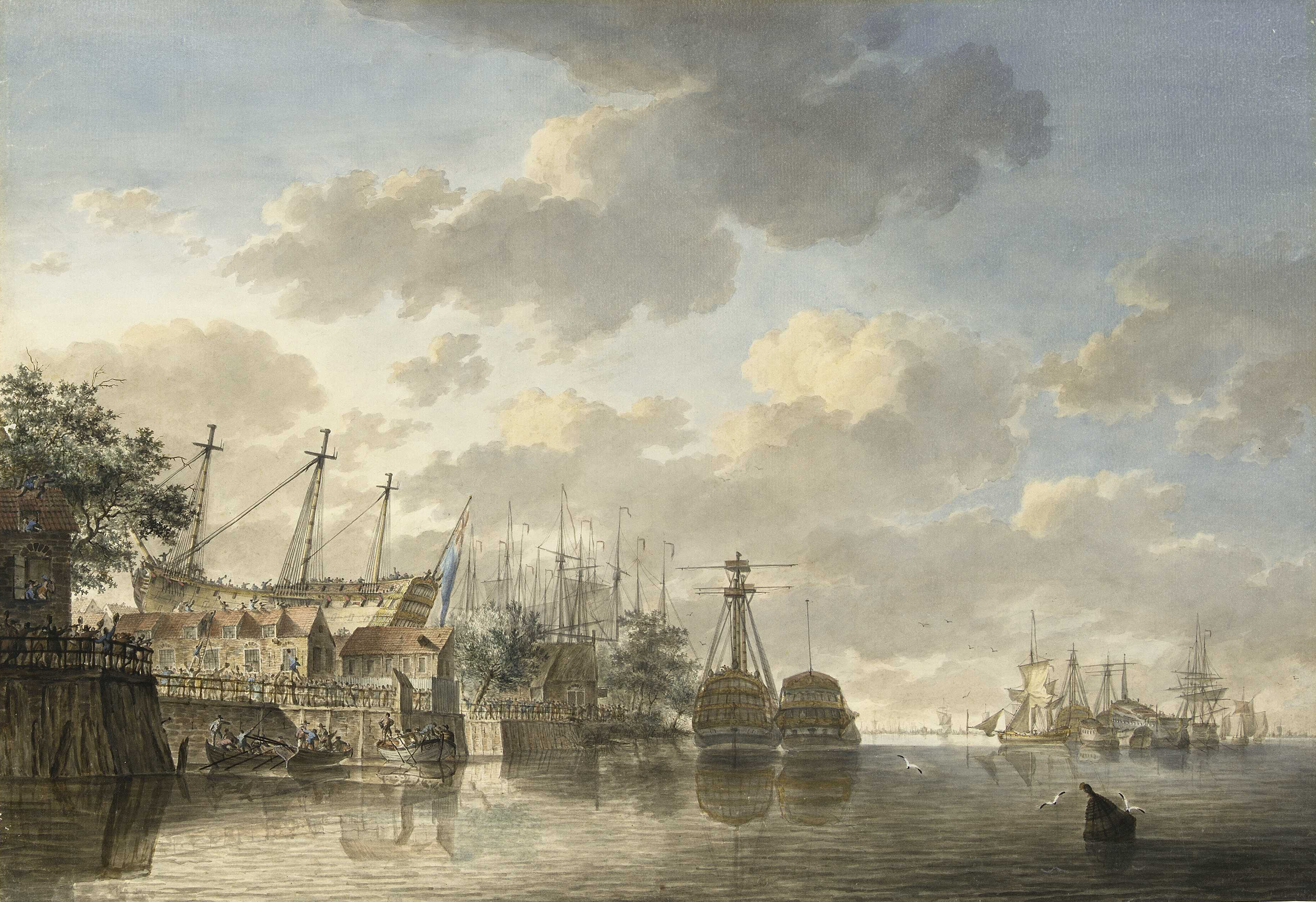
HMS Queen at the King's Dock Woolwich in 1771

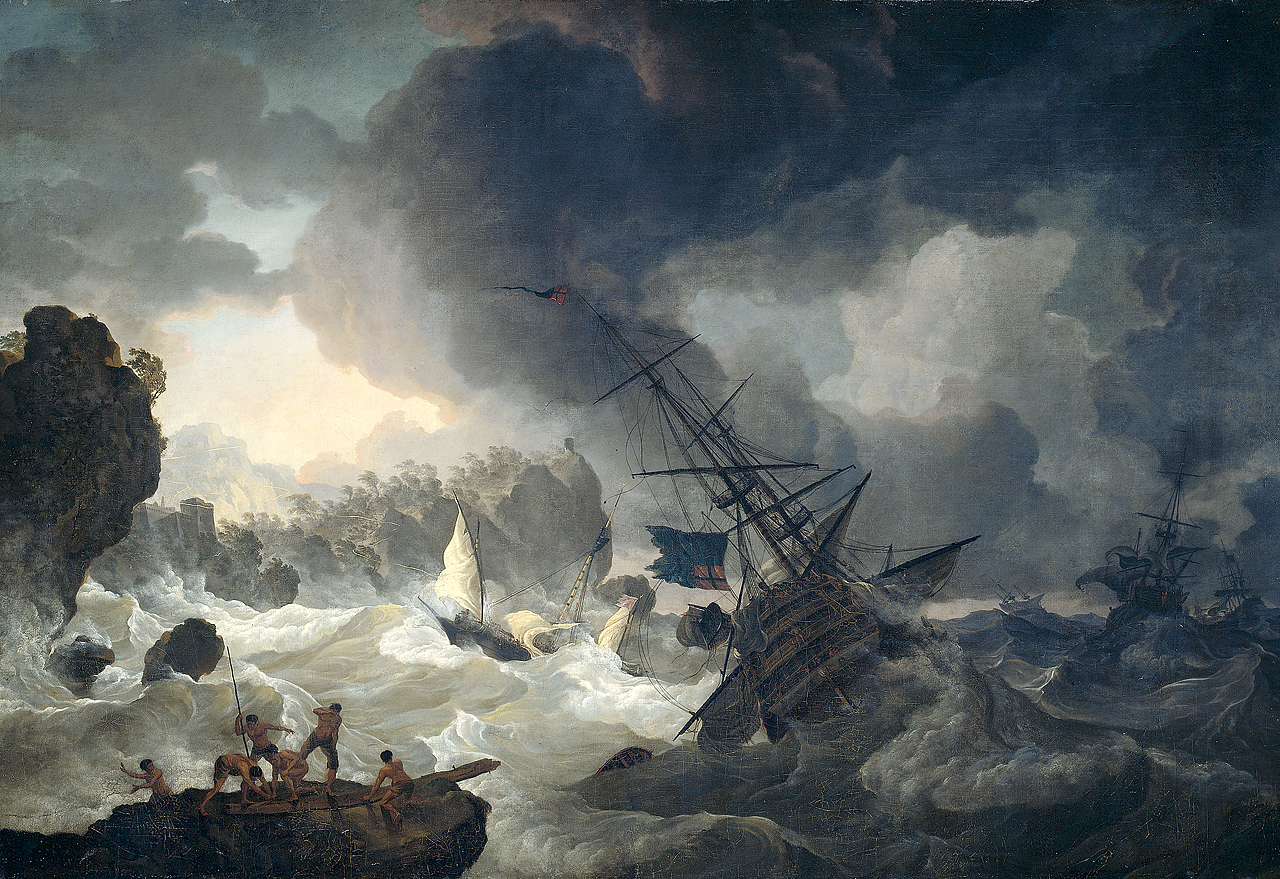
The Shipwreck (1775)
