= Egid Verhelst the Younger =

German engraver (1733–1804)

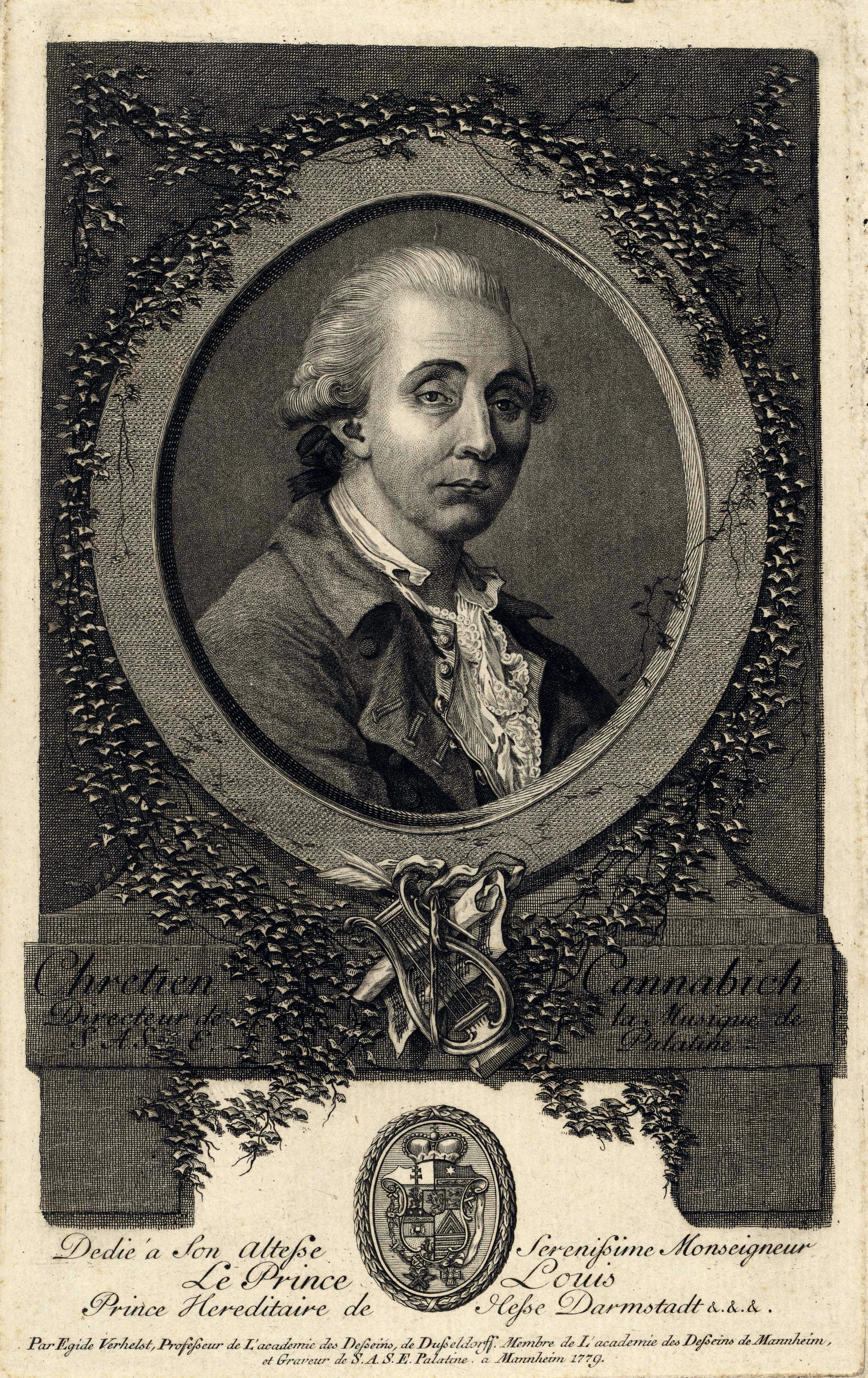
Engraving of Christian Cannabich by Egid Verhelst, 1779

Egid Verhelst the Younger (26 August 1733 – 13 January 1804) was a German painter, draughtsman, sculptor, and engraver.

== Biography ==
He was born in Ettal, the third son of Egid Verhelst the Elder, a sculptor from Antwerp. His older brothers Ignatz (born in 1726 in Munich) and Placidus (born in 1727 in Ettal) followed in their father's footsteps and became sculptors, while Egid's younger brother Aloys (born in 1747 in Augsburg) became best known for his engravings.

Verhelst learned the craft of engraving in Augsburg from his brother-in-law Rudolph Störcklin, then studied in Stuttgart and finally learned from the famous Johann Georg Wille in Paris.

He worked as an artist in Munich before being appointed academy professor and court copper engraver in Mannheim (capital of the Electoral Palatinate) by Charles Theodore, Elector of Bavaria in 1765. It was in Mannheim that Verhelst founded his own engraving school, which he shaped in the Parisian style. His portrait prints, in which he immortalized many of his contemporaries, were particularly famous.

In 1777 he followed the elector to the then Palatinate-Bavarian capital of Munich.

It was once assumed that he died on an unknown date in 1818 in Munich. However, in 1914 it was discovered in the church records of the Jesuit Church in Mannheim that he died on 13 January 1804.

Egid Verhelst was one of the teachers of the Bavarian court painter Wilhelm von Kobell, as well as Stephan von Stengel, Karl Matthias Ernst and the Mannheim copperplate engraver Heinrich Sintzenich. Also the Mannheim court painter Joseph Fratrel is counted among his students.
