= The Siege of Kosel (Wilhelm von Kobell) =

Painting by Wilhelm von Kobell

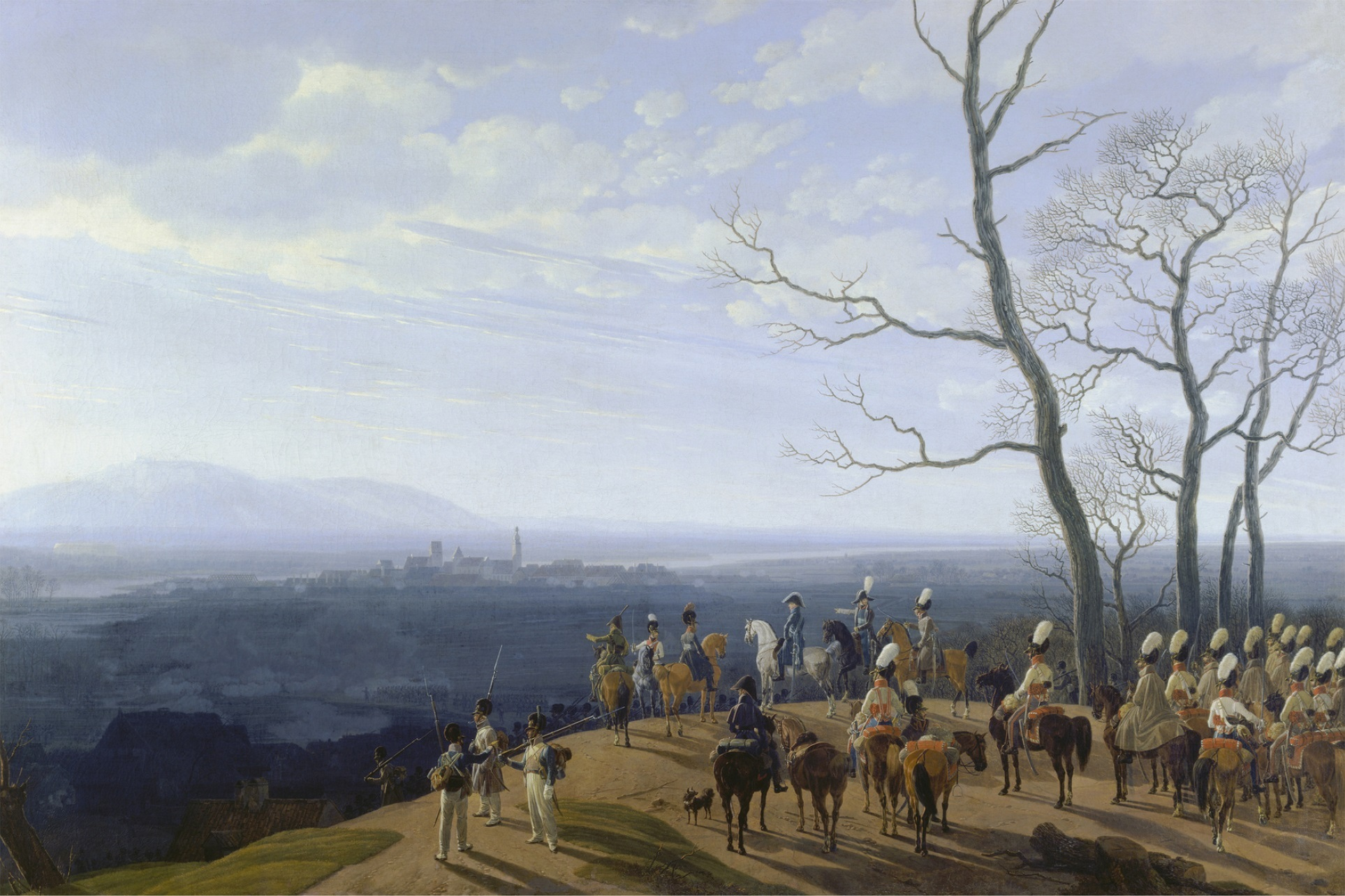
- Artist: Wilhelm von Kobell
- Year: 1808
- Medium: oil on canvas
- Dimensions: 202 cm × 305.5 cm (80 in × 120.3 in)
- Location: Neue Pinakothek, Munich

The Siege of Kosel is a large oil on canvas painting completed in 1808 by the German landscape artist Wilhelm von Kobell. It is now in the collection of the Neue Pinakothek, in Munich.

== History and description ==
The actual incident portrayed took place on 18 March 1806 during the Napoleonic Wars. Napoleon, with his Bavarian allies under Maximilian I Joseph of Bavaria, had successfully invaded Silesia, then under the control of Prussia. He had left his youngest brother Jérôme Bonaparte to carry out a mopping up exercise, involving the capture of a small number of fortified towns, including Kosel.

To celebrate the successful campaign, Maximilian (or otherwise Crown Prince Ludwig) later commissioned Kobell to produce a series of 12 large canvases to record the allies victorious engagements. The Siege of Kosel was the first in the series and, according to the inscription on the back of the painting, depicts the repulsing by the allies of a Prussian sortie (i.e. attempted breakout). This first canvas featured a stationary assembly of commanders, illuminated by the early morning sun, looking out over the distant town and the fighting in the shaded valley below. Later works in the series recorded actual battle scenes.

== See also ==
- 100 Great Paintings, 1980 BBC series
