= Wilhelm von Kobell =

German painter (1766–1853)

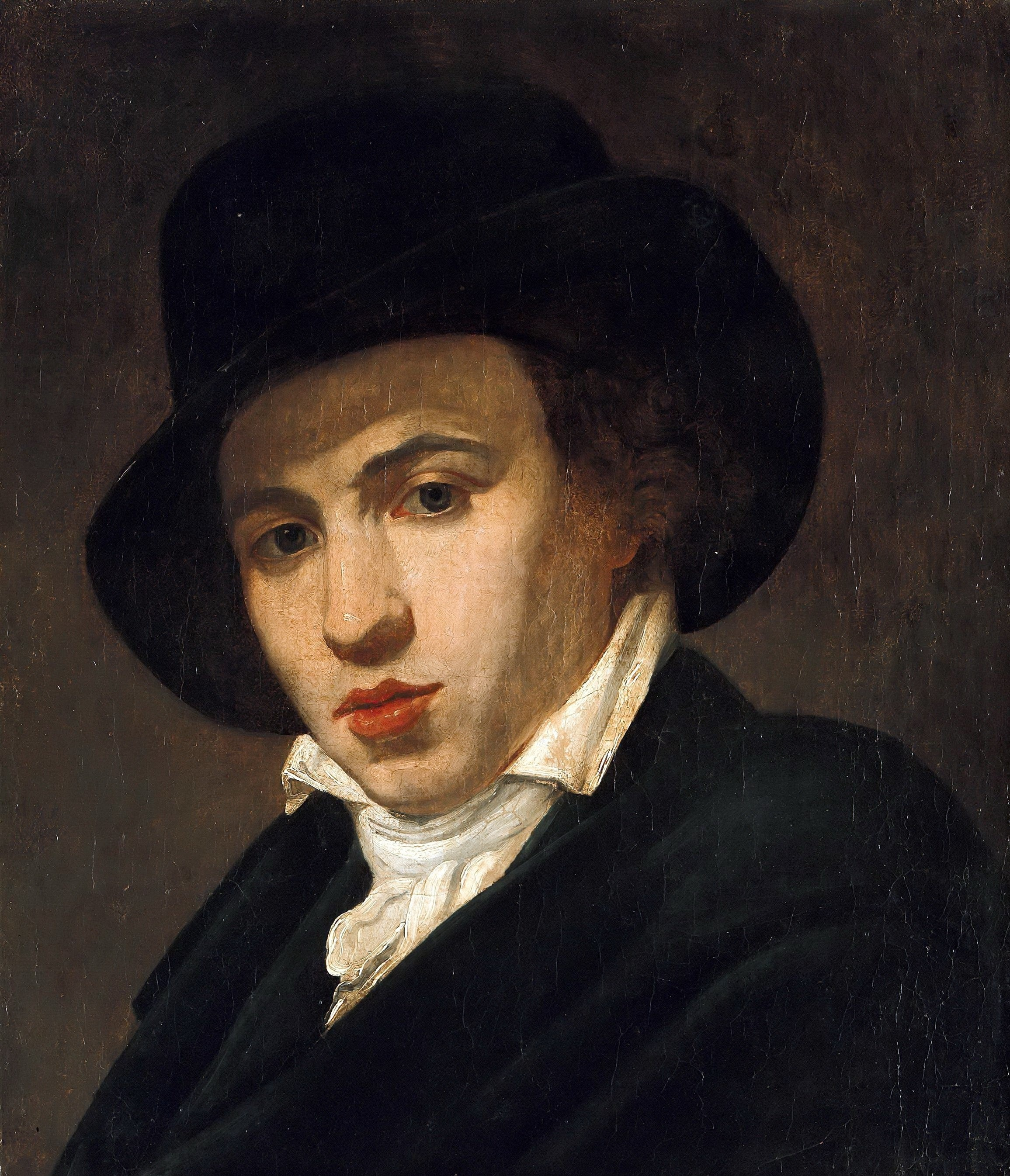
Self-portrait with Hat (c. 1800)

Wilhelm von Kobell (6 April 1766 – 15 July 1853) was a German painter, printmaker and teacher.

== Biography ==
Kobell was born in Mannheim, the son of Ferdinand Kobell, a landscape painter who cited Claude Lorrain as his influence. Wilhelm's initial lessons were supplied by his father and his uncle, Franz Kobell. He received further training under Franz Anton von Leydendorf and Egid Verhelst in the art of engraving at the Zeichnungsakademie in Mannheim. He studied the works in the galleries of Mannheim and Düsseldorf, especially those of Wouvermann, which he copied. During this time he practiced various styles, including 17th-century Dutch painting and 18th-century English art.

In 1778, he went to Rome, was made court painter at Mannheim after his return, and afterwards followed his father to Munich, where he became professor at the Academy in 1808. He was supported by Charles Theodore, Elector of Bavaria, who compensated him an annual sum of 500 florins from 1792 until Theodore's death in 1799. In 1809, he visited Vienna, and in 1810 Paris, to make studies for his battle pieces.

== Works ==
His early paintings were landscapes, rural genre scenes, and animal pieces, of which the galleries of Bamberg, Weimar, Mannheim, Karlsruhe, Berlin, Darmstadt, Frankfort, and Wiesbaden contain fine specimens. Throughout his life Kobell traveled to England, France and Italy but ultimately based his style on Dutch art. He gained a reputation through clever work on battle scenes and horses, as well as his very fine etchings and his especially fine aquatint engravings after Wouverman, Berchem, Roos, Ruysdael, and others, in which he reproduced the peculiar style of each master with uncommon success. His battle pieces contain many portraits of famous contemporaries. The New Pinakothek in Munich contains “The Third Day of the Battle of Hanau” (1808), and the Banquet Hall of the Königsbau the “Surrender of Brieg,” “Cavalry Skirmish at Arnhofen,” and the “Battles of Eckmühl and Wagram.”

== Selected paintings ==
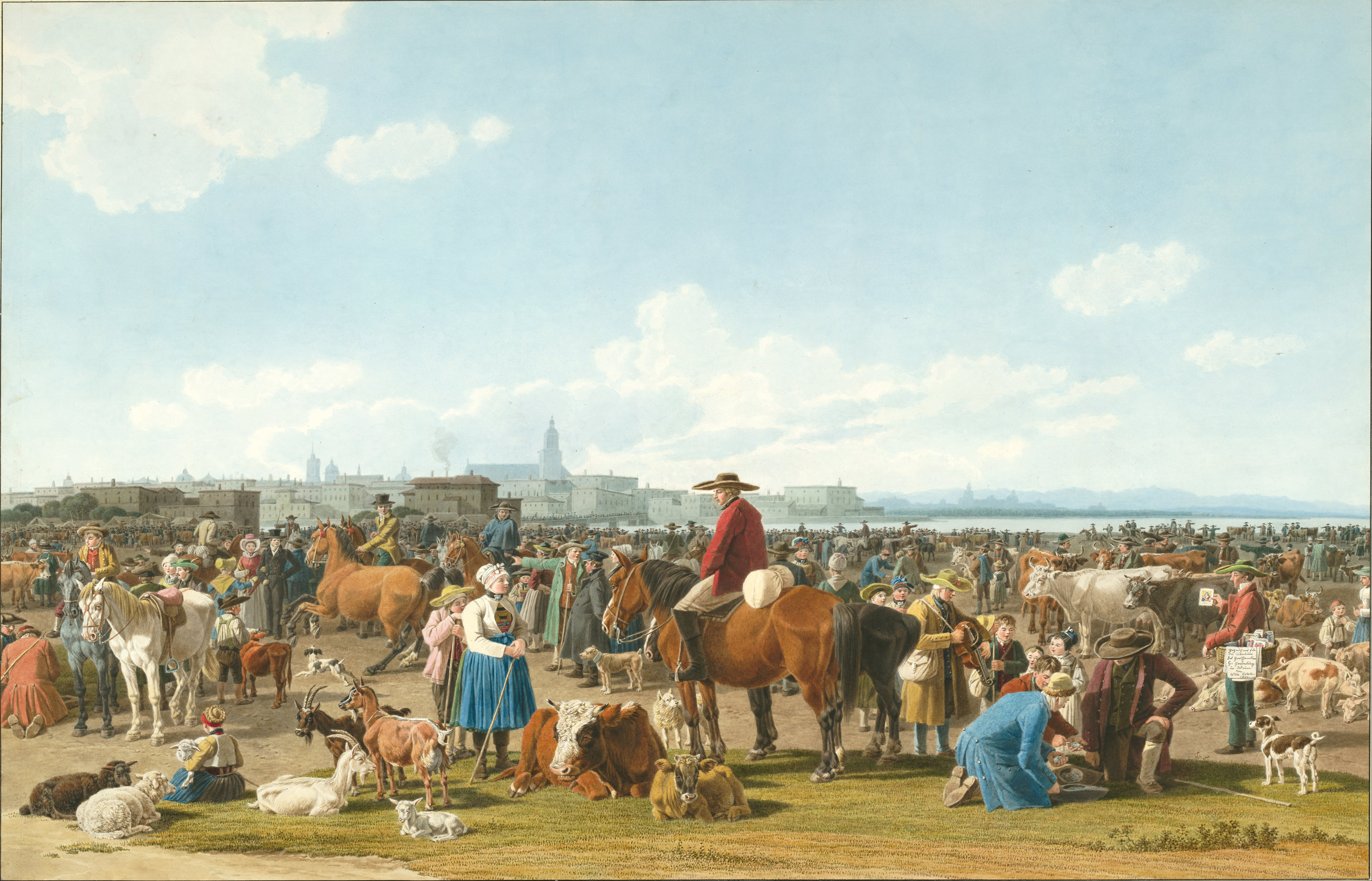
Cattle Market before
a Large City on a Lake, 1820

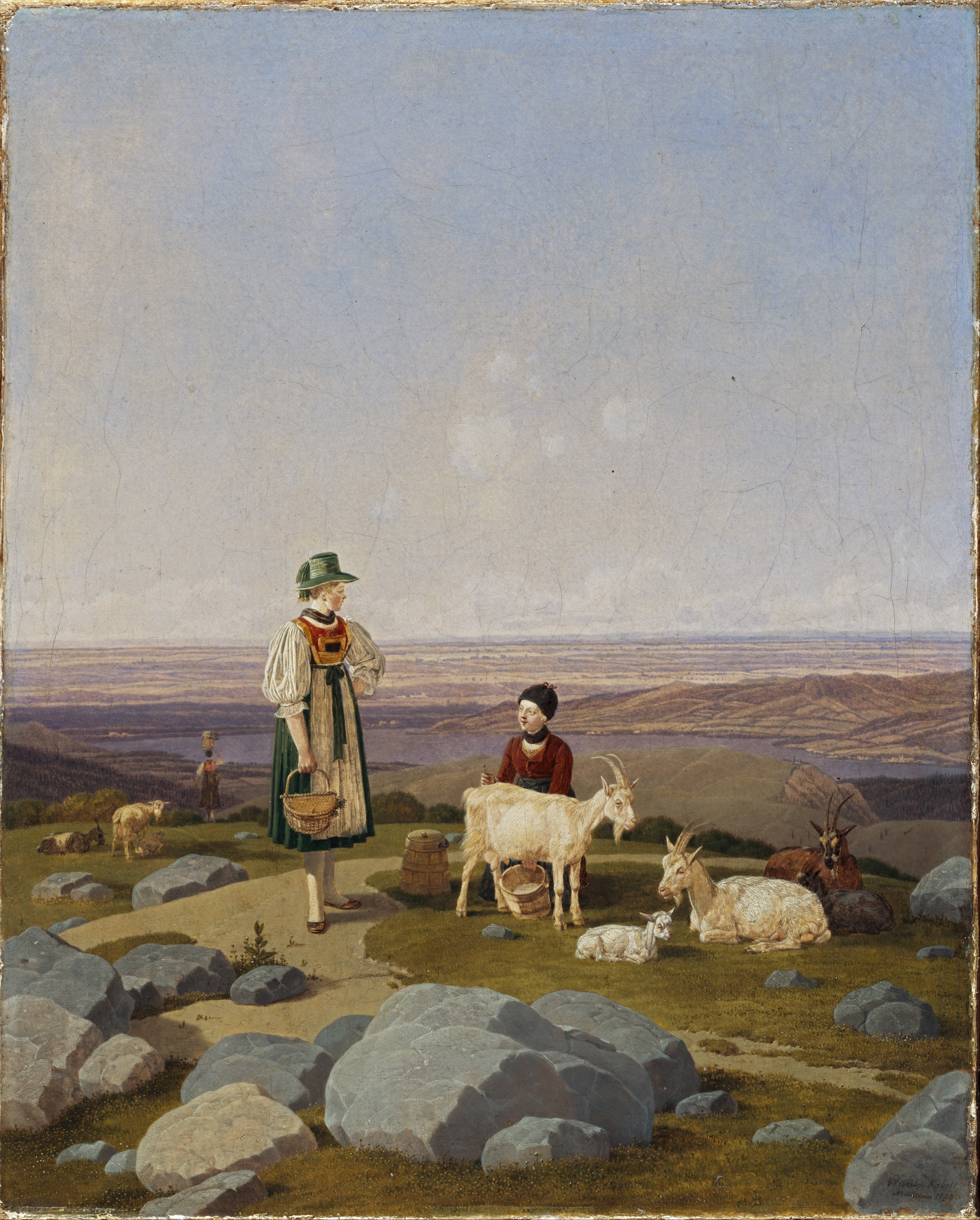
On Gaisalm

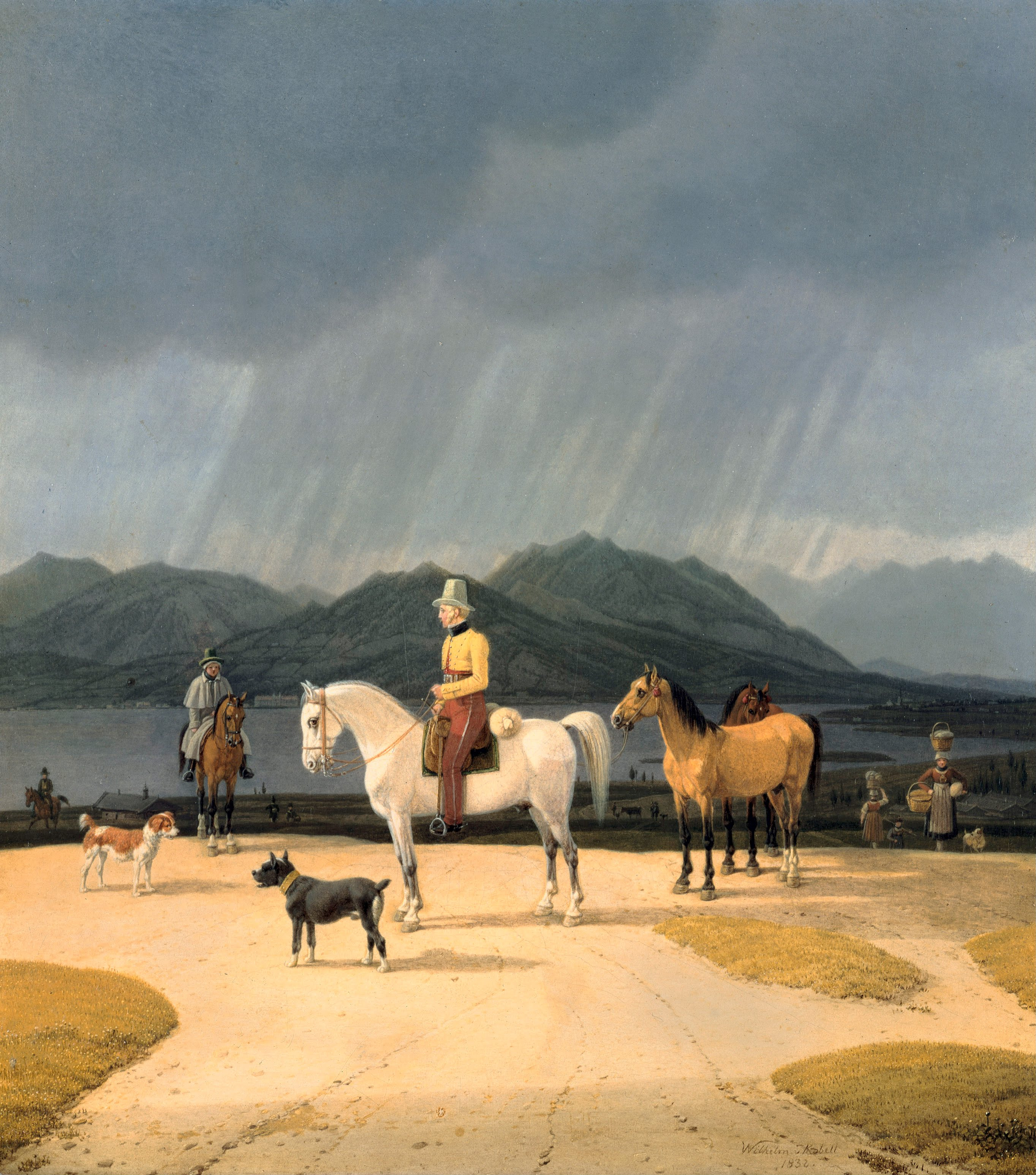
Reiter am Tegernsee

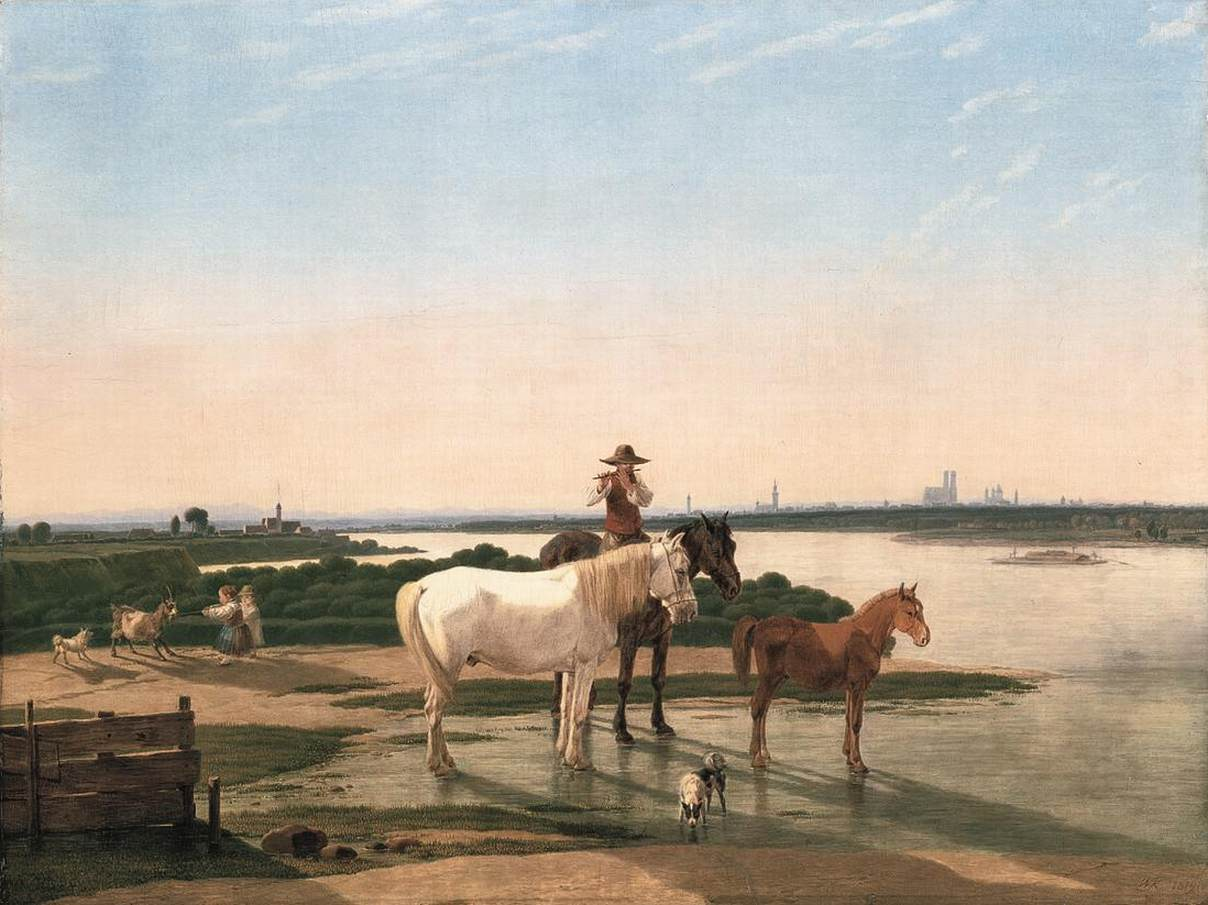
Landscape near Munich

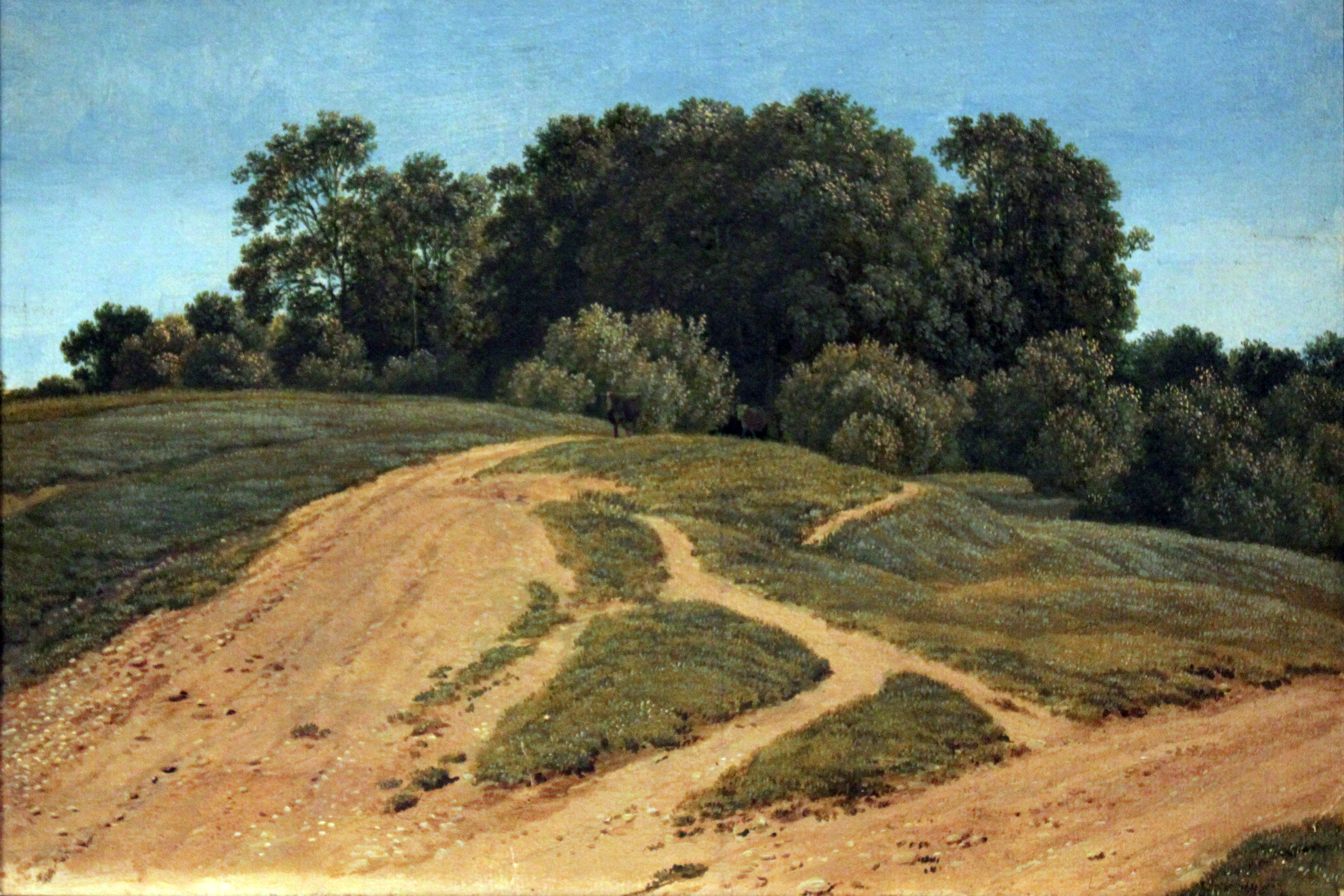
A Country Lane, 1821,
Hamburger Kunsthalle

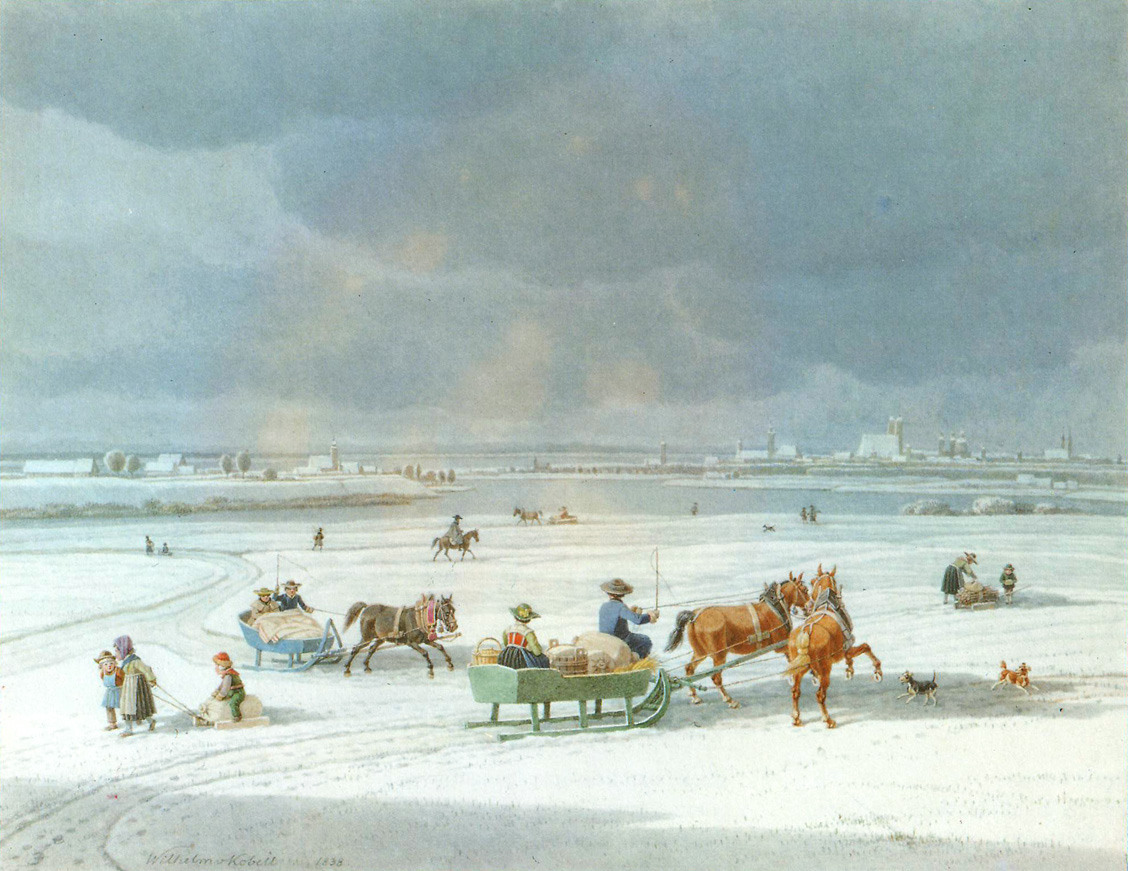
Winter View of Munich

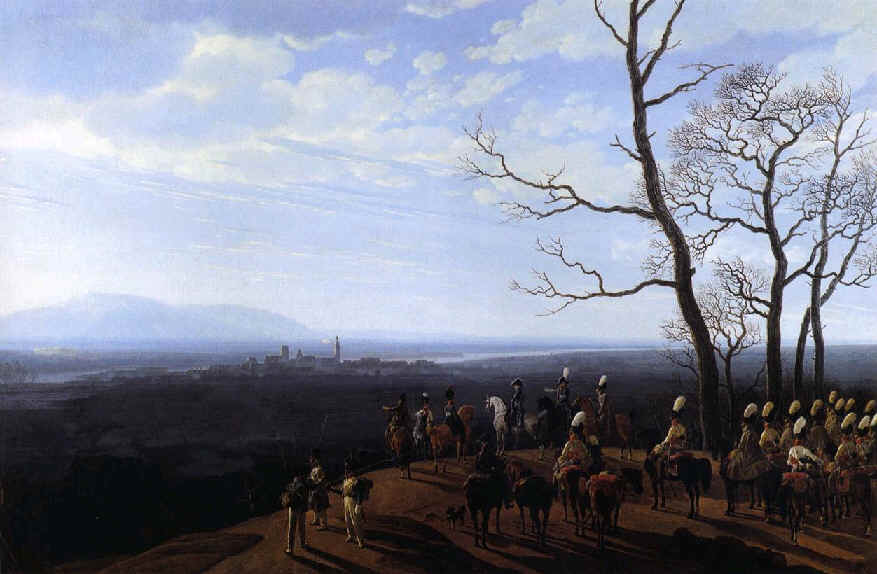
The Siege of Kosel, 1808,
Neue Pinakothek
