= Ettlinger =

Ettlinger is a German surname, deriving from Ettlingen, Germany. Notable people with the surname include:

- Adrian Ettlinger (1925–2013), American electrical engineer and pioneer in television and video technology
- Elisabeth Ettlinger (1915–2012), German-born Swiss archaeologist and academic
- Harry L. Ettlinger (1926–2018), American engineer
- Jacob Ettlinger (1798–1871), German rabbi and author, and one of the leaders of German Orthodoxy
- Leopold Ettlinger (1913–1989), Warburg Institute historian of the Italian renaissance and UC Berkeley Art Department Chair, 1970–80
- Marion Ettlinger (born 1949), photographer specializing in author portraits
- Max Ettlinger (1877–1929), German psychologist
- Yona Ettlinger (1924–1981), German-born Israeli clarinetist
