= Richard Lenel =

German businessman (1869–1950)

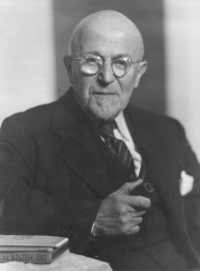
Richard Lenel.

Richard Lenel (29 July 1869, in Mannheim – 3 August 1950, in Neckargemünd) was a German businessman. He was chairman of the chamber of commerce and honorary citizen of the city of Mannheim.

== Biography ==
Richard Lenel joined his father Victor Lenel's company "Fabrik wasserdichter Wäsche Lenel, Bensinger u. Co." at the age of 23 and was promoted to general manager in 1897. In 1908, he was a founding member of the general workers committee of Mannheim-Ludwigshafen. From 1909 to 1920 he was a judge in commercial matters. In 1911, he was made chairman of the manufacturers society and was elected a member, 1920 chairman of the chamber of commerce. In 1922 he was, as a member of the German People's Party, elected a member of the citizens committee, on which he remained until 1930. For his efforts in support of the society for the promotion of the commercial university, he received the university's first honorary doctorate. In 1931, he was made chairman of a charitable relief society for the unemployed. On 27 March 1933, he was forced by the Nazi government to resign his seat in the chamber of commerce.

In the following years he attempted, together with his two eldest sons who remained in Germany, to hold on to his company, but the rigorous measures of 1938 forced him to sell his house and his company and flee to England, later to the USA. His nephew Ludwig Lenel became a well-known composer. In exile, he was utterly unhappy and returned thus already in 1949 to Germany. On 18 October 1949, an honorary citizenship of the city of Mannheim was bestowed upon him, the following day he was made honorary chairman of the chamber of industry and commerce. A few days after his 81st anniversary, he died and was buried at the Jewish cemetery in Mannheim. A road in the "honorary citizen area" of Mannheim-Feudenheim was named after him and a remembrance sign was attached to the high-rise building on the site of his former residence at Maximilianstrasse.

== Literature ==
- Watzinger, Karl Otto, Geschichte der Juden in Mannheim 1650-1945, Stuttgart, 1984, S. 119ff.
- Watzinger, Karl Otto, Richard Lenel 1869-1950, Mannheim 1972.
