= Egid Verhelst the Elder =

Flemish sculptor (1696–1749)

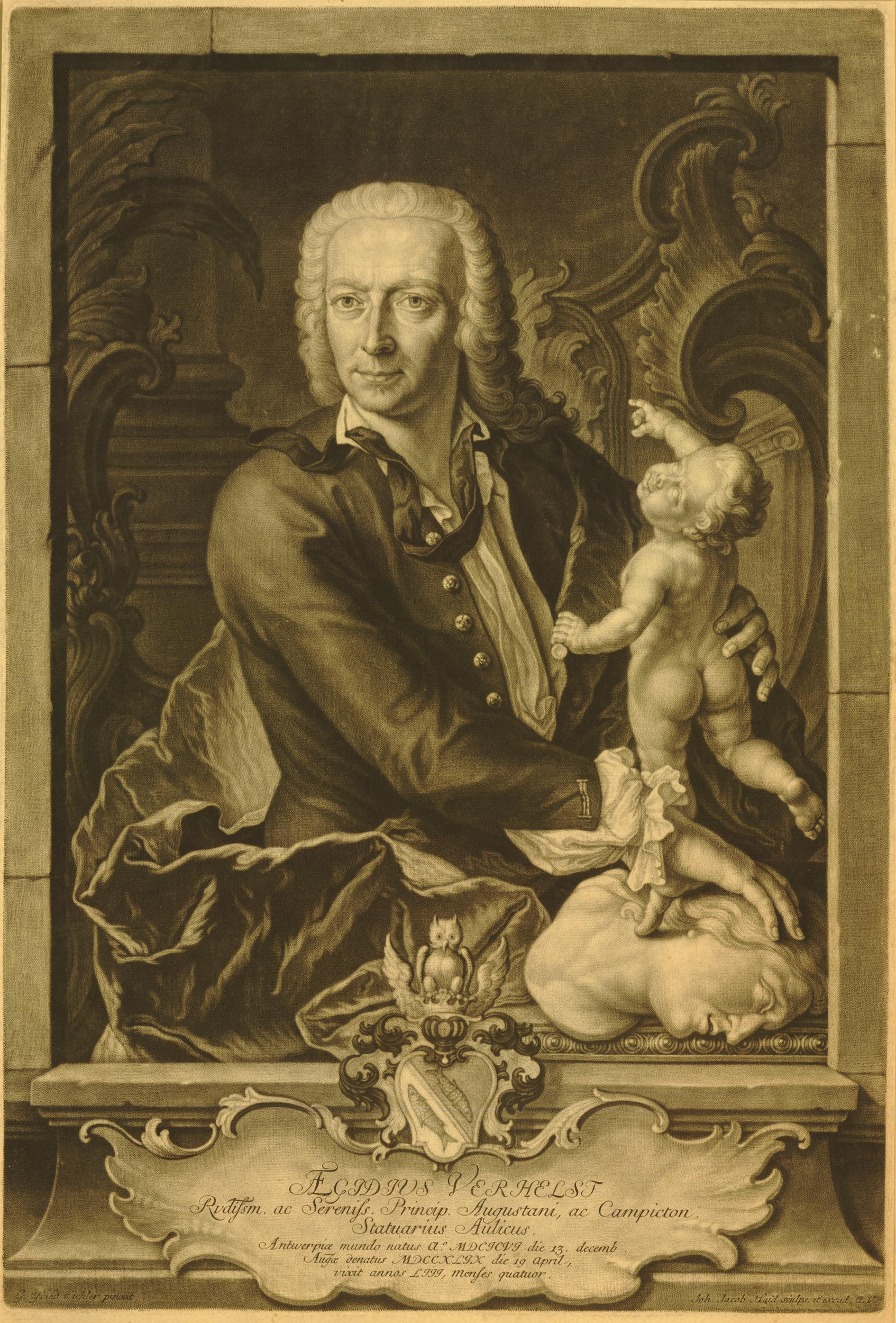
Portrait of Verhelst by Johann Jacob Haid

Egid Verhelst (13 December 1696 – 19 April 1749) was a Flemish sculptor active as a court sculptor in Germany. He made contributions to German sculpture with his activity in Bavaria. His cherubs were used for decades as models by stuccoists of the Wessobrunner School.

== Biography ==
He was born in Antwerp where he was baptized on 13 December 1696. He received his first training in Antwerp and probably came to the workshop of the Flemish Willem de Groff in Paris. He also worked for Maximilian II Emanuel, Elector of Bavaria in Brussels and was called to the Wittelsbach court after his return to Munich in 1716. As a result, Verhelst came to Munich in 1718, worked for several years in de Groff's workshop and joined the circle of court artists. In 1724, he was a court sculptor for Duke Johann Theodor of Bavaria, Prince-Bishop of Freising.

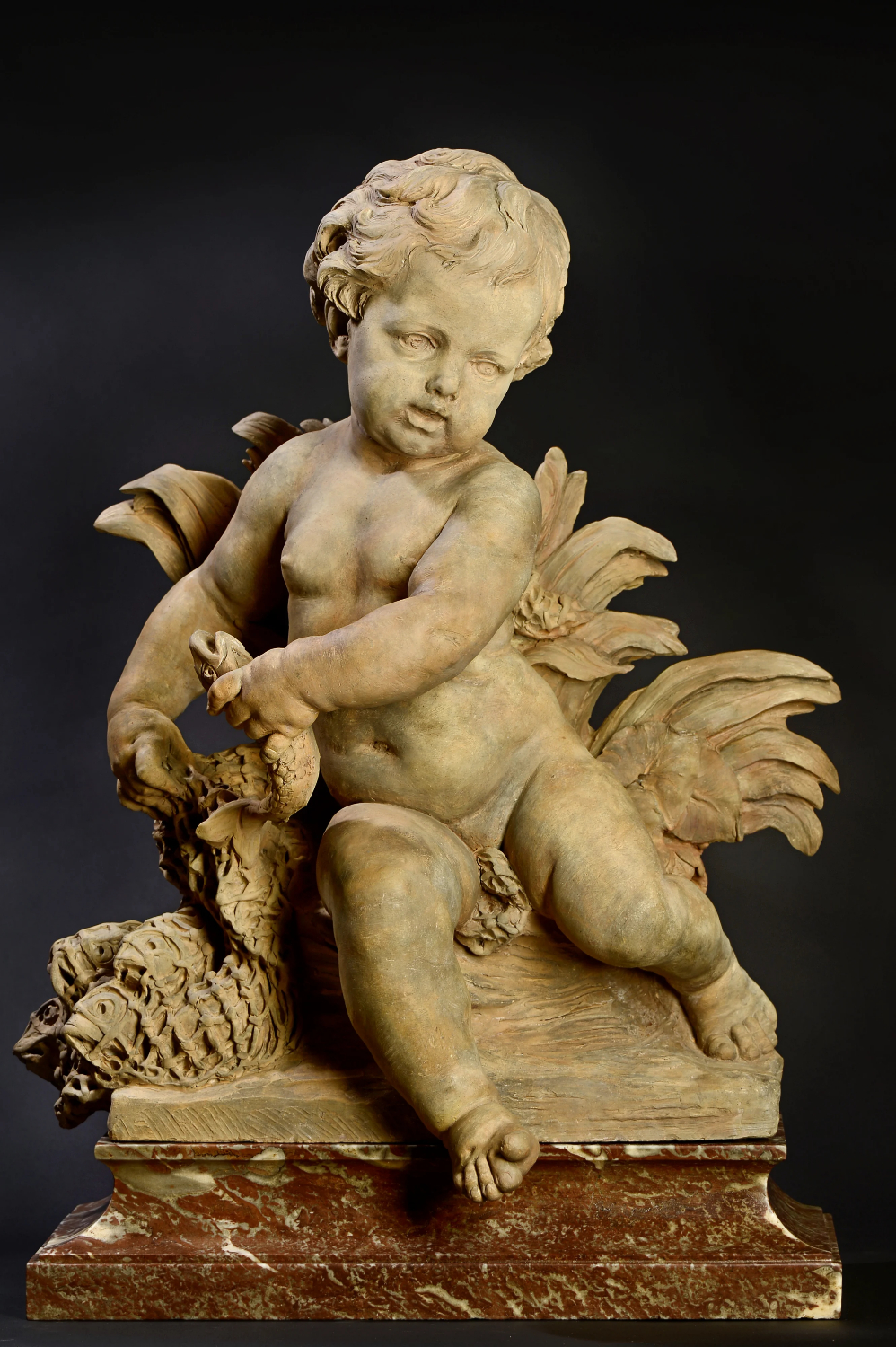
Putto with a fishing net

On 19 November 1724, he married Maria Benedicta Hagn in Munich, who worked with him as a wax modeller, sculpting after his designs. In 1728, he became a citizen of Augsburg.

At the time of his death he was a court sculptor at the Princely Abbey of Kempten. His student Joseph Bonaventura Mutschelle (1728–1778 / 83) married his widow in 1759.

His sons Ignaz Wilhelm (1729–1792) and Placidus (1727–1778), who had trained with him, took over the family workshop, continuing it until 1774. His daughter Anna Franziska Walburga married the copper engraver Johann Rudolf Störchlin (c. 1720 – c. 1754) and then painter Joseph Christ (1731–1788) in her second marriage. His youngest son Egid the Younger studied with his brother-in-law and became a copper engraver.
