= Trübner =

Trübner is a surname. Notable people with the surname include:

- Alice Trübner (1875 –1916), German artist
- Matthias Trübner, East German bobsledder who competed in the mid-1980s
- Michael Trübner, East German bobsledder who competed in the early 1980s
- Nicholas Trübner (1817–1884), German-English publisher and linguist
- Wilhelm Trübner (1851–1917), German realist painter of the circle of Wilhelm Leibl

== See also ==
- Trübner & Co, a publisher now part of Routledge
