= Victor Lenel =

Viktor Lenel (18 June 1838 in Mannheim – 17 October 1917 in Mannheim) was a German-Jewish businessman who headed several companies involved in the early production of plastics.

Lenel graduated from the University of Heidelberg in 1866 and joined his father's trading company. After the death of his father he continued to run the company, and together with his brother Alfred renamed it "Lenel Brothers." In 1873 the two brothers, together with Frederick Bensinger and the bank Hohenems & Sons, founded the Rhine Rubbergoods Factory (Rhein. Hartgummi-Waren-Fabrik), which produced plastics, mainly soft rubber and celluloid. After the factory was destroyed by fire in 1885, it was rebuilt under the name of Rhine Rubber and Celluloid factory (Rheinische Gummi und Celluloidfabrik) in Mannheim-Neckerau. In 1907 the company employed about 500 laborers and 15 administrative staff. In 1886 the "Factory of Waterproof Laundry Lenel, Bensinger & Co" was founded. The Rhine Rubber and Celluloid factory developed the blow-press method for plastics, used for the production of doll heads and table tennis balls made of celluloid. In 1899 the turtle was protected retroactively to 1889 as a trademark.

From 1875, Victor Lenel was a member of the Civil Committee, a commercial judge, and a member of several boards of corporations, including chairman of the Hamburg-Mannheimer insurance company from 1899 to 1905. He was also vice-president (1898-1903) and chairman (1903-1911) of the Mannheim Chamber of Commerce. From 1905 to 1909 he was the first Jewish member of the first chamber of States. After the death of his father (1876) he founded with his siblings the "Moritz-and-Caroline-Lenel Foundation" to support needy students, and on the occasion of his 70th Birthday he founded a convalescent home for children, the Victor-Lenel-foundation at Neckargemünd, which was handed over in 1911 to the administration of the city of Mannheim. His son Richard Lenel continued the family business until 1938.

== Literature ==
- Lenel, Victor in Neue Deutsche Biographie 14 (1985), p. 203
- Toury, Jacob et al., Jüdische Textilunternehmer in Baden-Württemberg 1683-1938
- Watzinger Karl Otto, "Lenel, Viktor" in: Geschichte der Juden in Mannheim 1650-1945
