= Jan Kobell =

Dutch painter

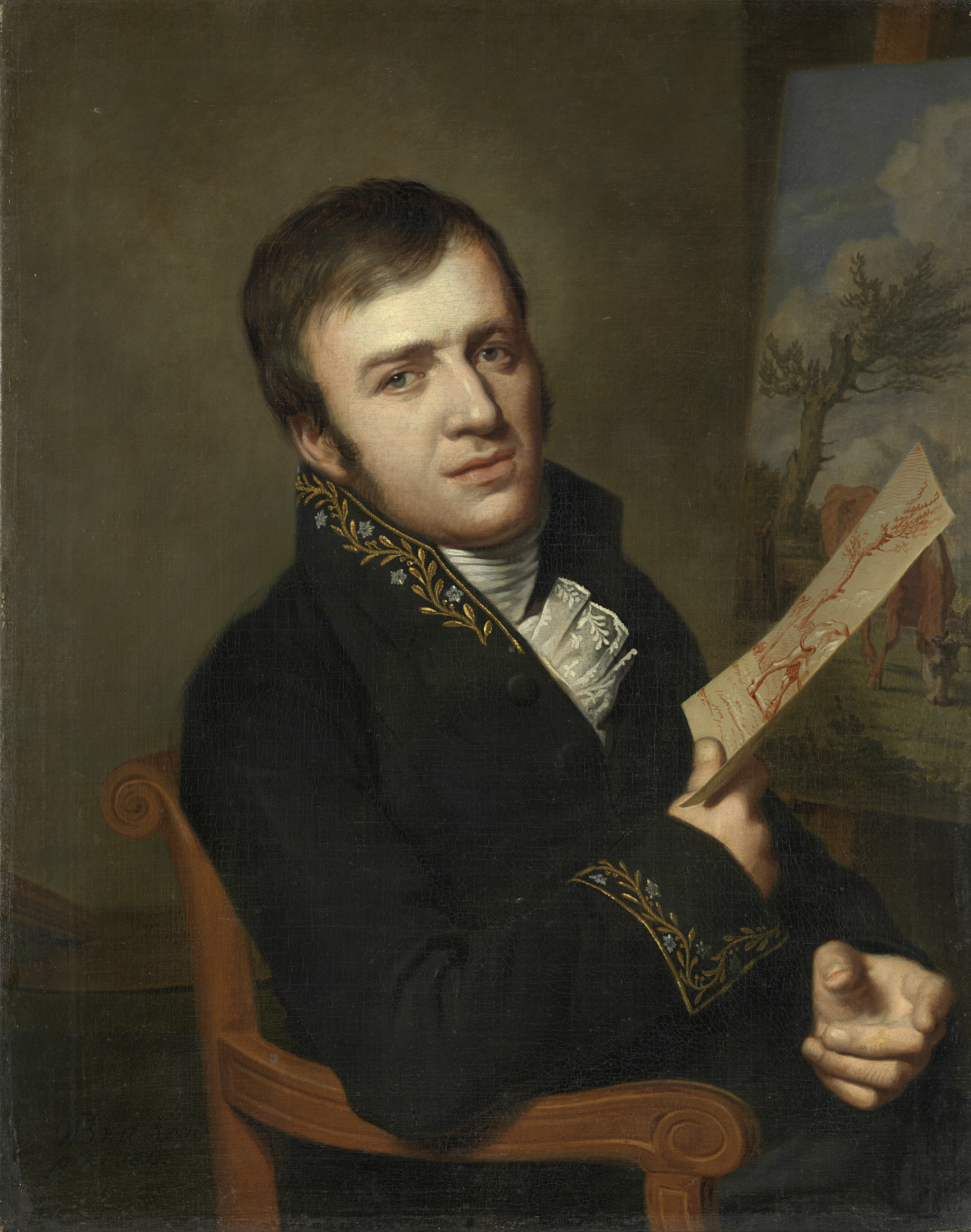
- Portrait of Jan Kobell by Willem Bartel van der Kooi, 1811
- Born: 1779; Delfshaven, Netherlands
- Died: 14 September 1814 (aged 34–35); Amsterdam
- Known for: Animal and landscape paintings

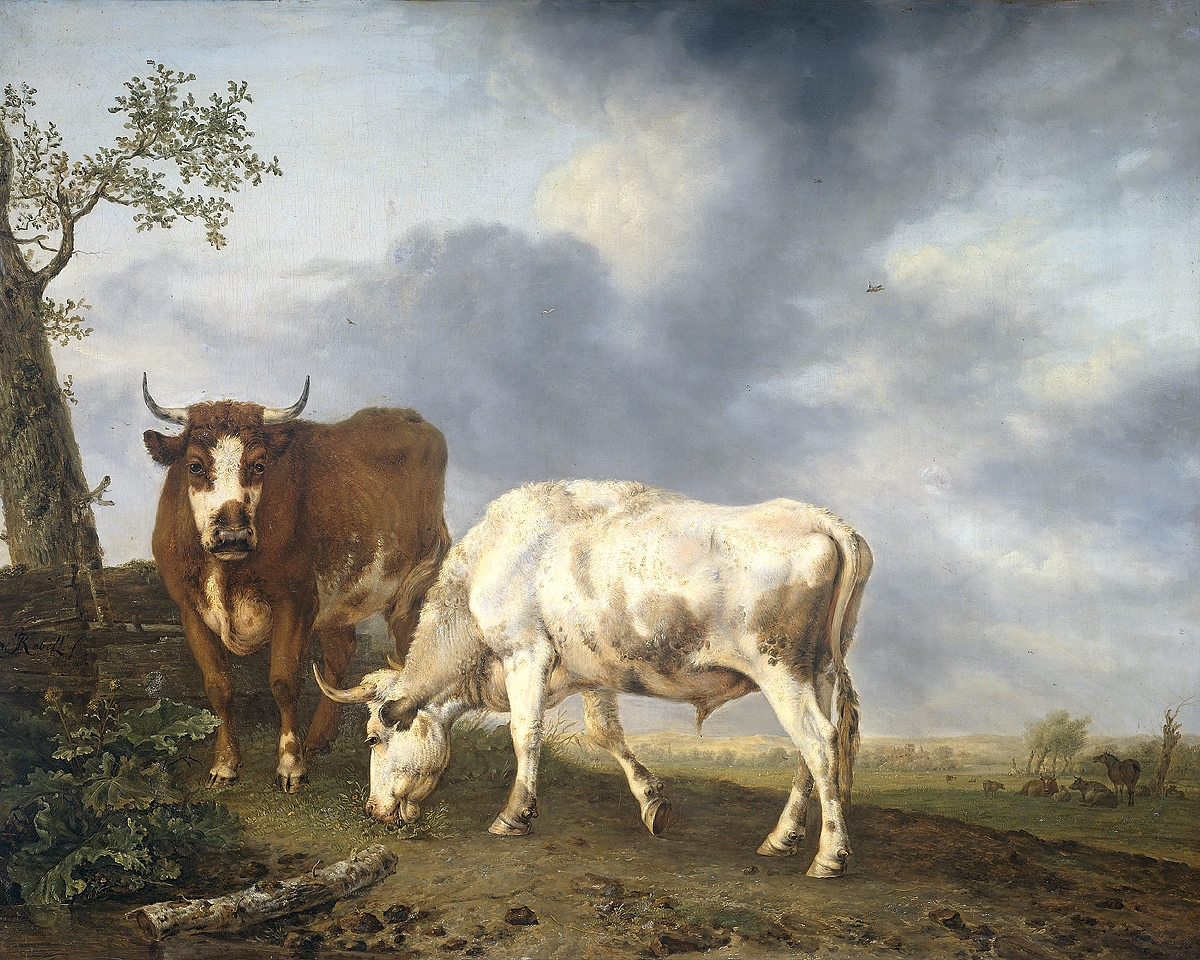
Oxen in a meadow (1806)

Jan Kobell (born Delfshaven, 1779; died Amsterdam, 14 September 1814) was a Dutch animal and landscape painter.

== Biography ==
He was a pupil of Willem Rutgaart van der Wall at Utrecht. He studied diligently from nature, and took Paul Potter for his model, acquiring his talent for animal as well as landscape work. In 1812 he went to Paris, where he won the gold medal and high praise from art critics. His popularity increased rapidly until his premature death. Of his cattle pieces, noted for their technique and precision of drawing, there are excellent specimens in the museums of Amsterdam and Rotterdam.

== Family ==
Jan Kobell was the son of Hendrik Kobell. He is often called Jan Kobell II to distinguish him from his uncle, or Jan Kobell the elder to distinguish him from his cousin. The uncle Jan Kobell (born Rotterdam, 1756; died 1833) engraved anatomical plates, and his only well-known work was a series of historical portraits (1787). The cousin Jan Kobell (born Rotterdam 1800; died 1838) was a landscape and cattle painter. He was the son of Jan the engraver uncle. He attended Rotterdam Academy, and painted his principal work, a life-size cattle piece, in 1830. Anna (1795–1847), sister of Jan the younger, was also a noted artist.
