= Joseph Fratrel =

French painter

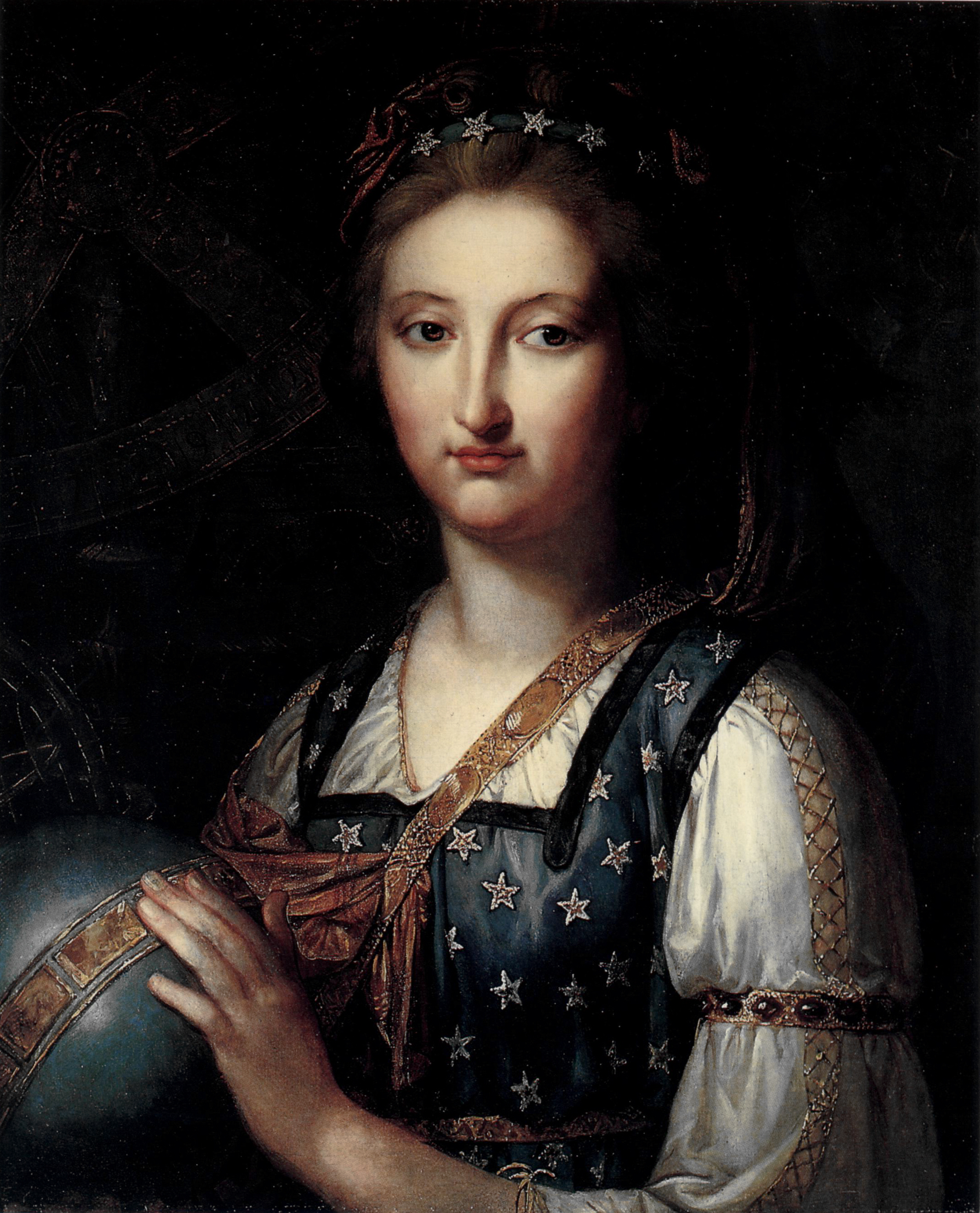
Allegory of Astronomy, ca. 1780, now in the Reiss-Engelhorn Museum in Mannheim

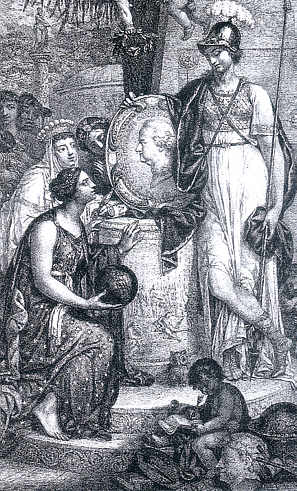
The Apotheosis of Elector Charles Theodore, 1779

Joseph Fratrel, was a distinguished painter and etcher in France. Born at Épinal in 1730, he was a scholar of Baudouin in Paris. He became court painter for King Stanislaus and the Elector-Palatine Charles Theodore: in the Darmstadt Museum is a portrait of the Electress. He died at Mannheim on 15 May 1783. The following are his best-known works:

- Joseph's Dream; after L. Krahe.
- The Miller's Son.
- St. Nicholas.
