= Ludwig Lenel =

German organist and composer (1914–2002)

- Born: May 20, 1914; Strasburg, German Empire
- Died: April 22, 2002 (aged 87) Bryn Mawr, Pennsylvania, U.S.
- Occupation: Music educator
- Instrument: Organ
- Years active: 1940-2022

Ludwig Lenel (May 20, 1914 – April 22, 2002) was a German organist and composer.

== Early life and education ==
Lenel was born May 20, 1914, in Strasburg, Germany during the German Empire in present-day France, the son of the late Walter and Luise (Borckenhagen) Lenel. During his youth, Lenel met and was strongly influenced by Albert Schweitzer, who frequently stayed with the Lenel family while visiting Heidelberg.

He then later studied organ with Schweitzer, and assisted him on tours of Germany and Switzerland in 1932 and 1936, respectively. In between those tours, Lenel's concert for two violins and string orchestra premiered at the Collegium Musicum in Heidelberg in 1933. In 1935, he was awarded his diploma from Hochschule fuer Musik in Cologne. In 1938, he was awarded a diploma from Basel Music Academy in Switzerland.

After emigrating to the United States, Lenel worked as an organist while continuing his study of music composition at Oberlin College in Oberlin, Ohio, where he was awarded his masters of music degree in 1940.

== Career ==
Lenel served on the faculties of Monticello College and Elmhurst College in Illinois, Westminster College in Pennsylvania, and The New School for Social Research in New York City.

He then joined the faculty of Muhlenberg College in Allentown, Pennsylvania, where he taught for 27 years as a music professor. During his tenure at Muhlenberg College, he created the college's music department's curriculum, established its major in music, and served as conductor of the college choir. He initiated a concert series and took the group on tour, and later founded Muhlenberg College's Department of Opera.

In 1979, Lenel retired from Muhlenberg College. In 1989, he was awarded an honorary doctorate by the college.

On November 9, 1998, Lenel returned to Heidelberg to attend the performance of his main oeuvre, Death and Atonement in memory of the Holocaust. The 20-minute-long concert, written between 1976 and 1992, is based on Paul Celan's poem Todesfuge and texts by Nelly Sachs. Composer Wolfgang Fortner mentions Lenel and others as witnesses and examples of his teaching Jewish students before and during World War II in the attachment of his Story of Life.

== Death ==
Lenel died on April 22, 2002, in Bryn Mawr, Pennsylvania. Funeral services were held May 24, 2002, in the Egner Memorial Chapel at Muhlenberg College in Allentown, Pennsylvania. His obituary noted that he was the "former husband of Jane Lenel," and that he was survived by a son, two daughters, a brother and a sister, and three grandchildren.

== Literature ==
- Anderson, E. Ruth. Contemporary American composers. A biographical dictionary, Second edition, G. K. Hall, 1982.
- Borroff, Edith; Clark, J. Bunker. American opera. A checklist, Harmonie Park Press, 1992.

== Sources ==
- Rhein-Neckar-Zeitung Heidelberg 4. und 9. November 1998.
- Givannini/Moraw (Ed.). Erinnertes Leben – Autobiographische Texte zur jüdischen Geschichte Heidelbergs, Heidelberg 1998.
