= Franz Kobell =

German painter, etcher and draftsman

- Born: November 23, 1749; Mannheim, Holy Roman Empire
- Died: January 14, 1822 (aged 72); Munich, Kingdom of Bavaria
- Known for: Landscape, architecture drawings and etchings

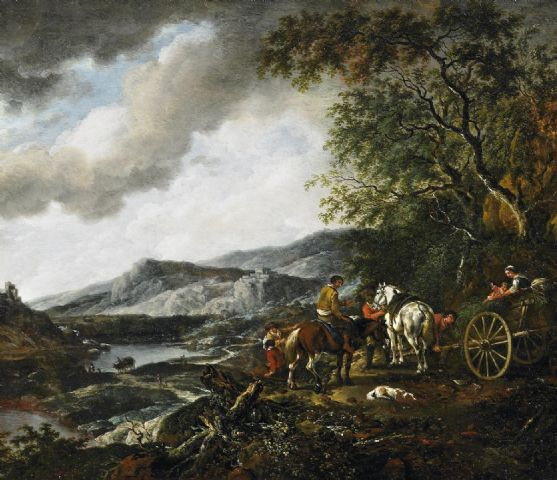
River landscape with travelers (178x)

Franz Kobell (23 November 1749 – 14 January 1822) was a German painter, etcher and draftsman.

== Biography ==
He was born in Mannheim. The Elector Karl Theodor of Bavaria sent him to Italy (1776) to study art and he remained there till 1785, working from nature and monumental buildings, mainly in Rome. He next lived at Munich, where he became painter to the court. He died in Munich in 1822.

== Works ==
He produced only a few oil paintings, highly praised by Goethe, a notable example being Rocky landscape with waterfalls, once in the Bamberg gallery. Endowed as he was with an exuberant fancy and extraordinary facility of production, the process of painting proved too slow to keep pace with his ideas, and he mostly confined himself to the use of pen and pencil, leaving 20,000 landscape and architecture pen drawings and etchings.

== Family ==
He was the brother of Ferdinand Kobell.
