= Ferdinand Kobell =

18th Century German painter and engraver

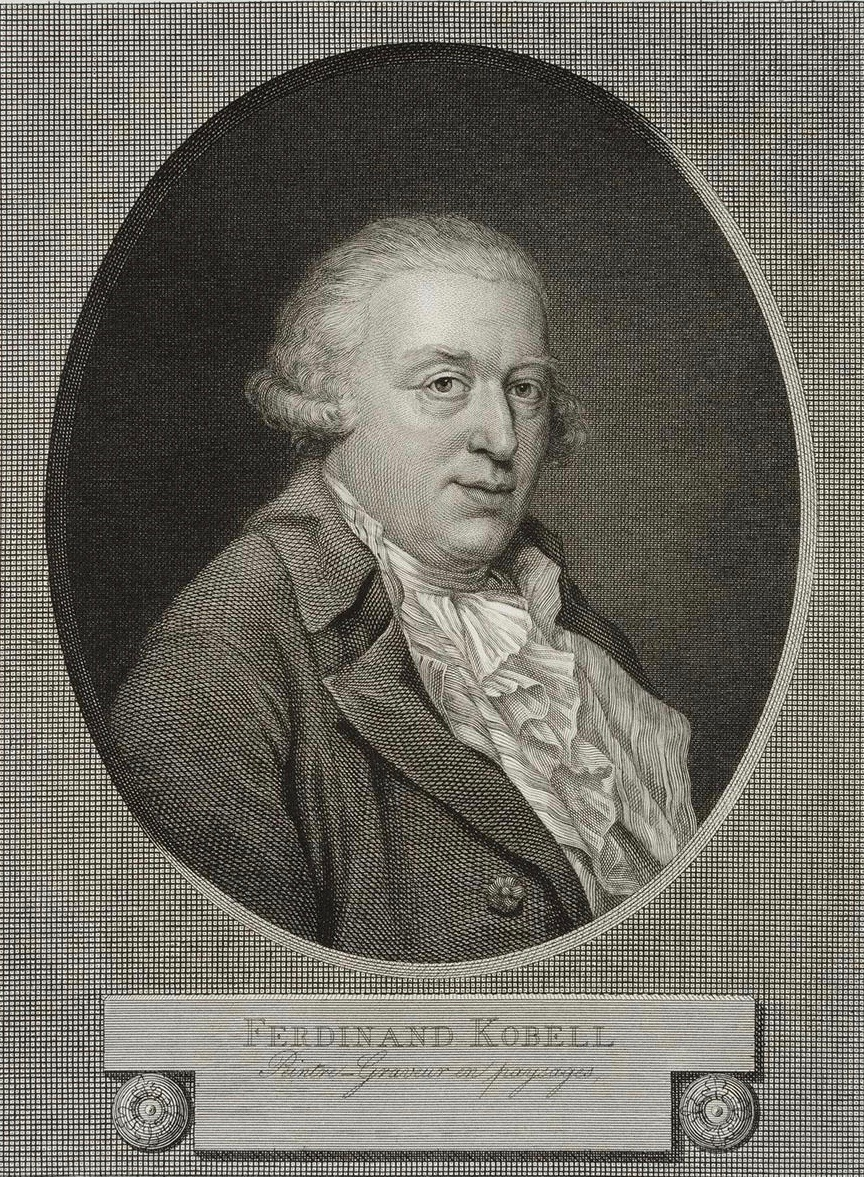
- Ferdinand Kobell, by Wilhelm Friedrich Schlotterbeck
- Born: 7 June 1740; Mannheim
- Died: 1 February 1799 (aged 58); Munich
- Occupations: painter and copper engraver
- Known for: landscapes
- Parents: Balthasar Kobell (father); Maria Franziska née Mezinger (mother)
- Relatives: Johann Heinrich Kobell, grandfather, grocer

Ferdinand Kobell (7 June 1740, Mannheim – 1 February 1799, Munich) was a German painter and copper engraver.

== Biography ==
His family was originally from Hesse. His grandfather, Johann Heinrich Kobell, was a prosperous grocer who came to Mannheim from Frankfurt-am-Main in 1720. His parents were Balthasar Kobell (d.1762), an entrepreneur and Court Councilor, and Maria Franziska née Mezinger (1718–1762).

He initially studied law in Heidelberg, becoming a secretary to the court in 1760, but he soon turned his attention to painting. He was released from service, and obtained a scholarship to attend the Mannhiem Drawing Academy. In 1764, he started work as a theatrical painter and married Maria Anna Lederer (1744–1820), daughter of one of the Court Councilors. They had seven children, including Wilhelm von Kobell, who became a landscape, animal and battle painter.

In 1766, he was appointed court painter. To complete his training, he took an eighteen-month study trip to Paris, where he made contact with the expatriate German engraver, Johann Georg Wille.

In 1794, when his court patron, Elector Charles Theodore decided to move from Mannheim to Munich, he followed him there. In 1798, he was named Director of the Palatinate Painting Gallery, which had been moved from Düsseldorf to Mannheim, but he died before he could return there and take up his post.

He specialized in landscapes, inspired by the style of Nicolaes Pieterszoon Berchem. His oil paintings are in a number of German galleries (Karlsruhe, Darmstadt, Stuttgart, and Augsburg), but his work as an engraver is considered more important. His etchings (about 300) were published by Frauenholz, in Munich (1809), as Œuvres complètes de Ferdinand Kobell. More were published by Kugler (Stuttgart, 1842).

== Gallery ==
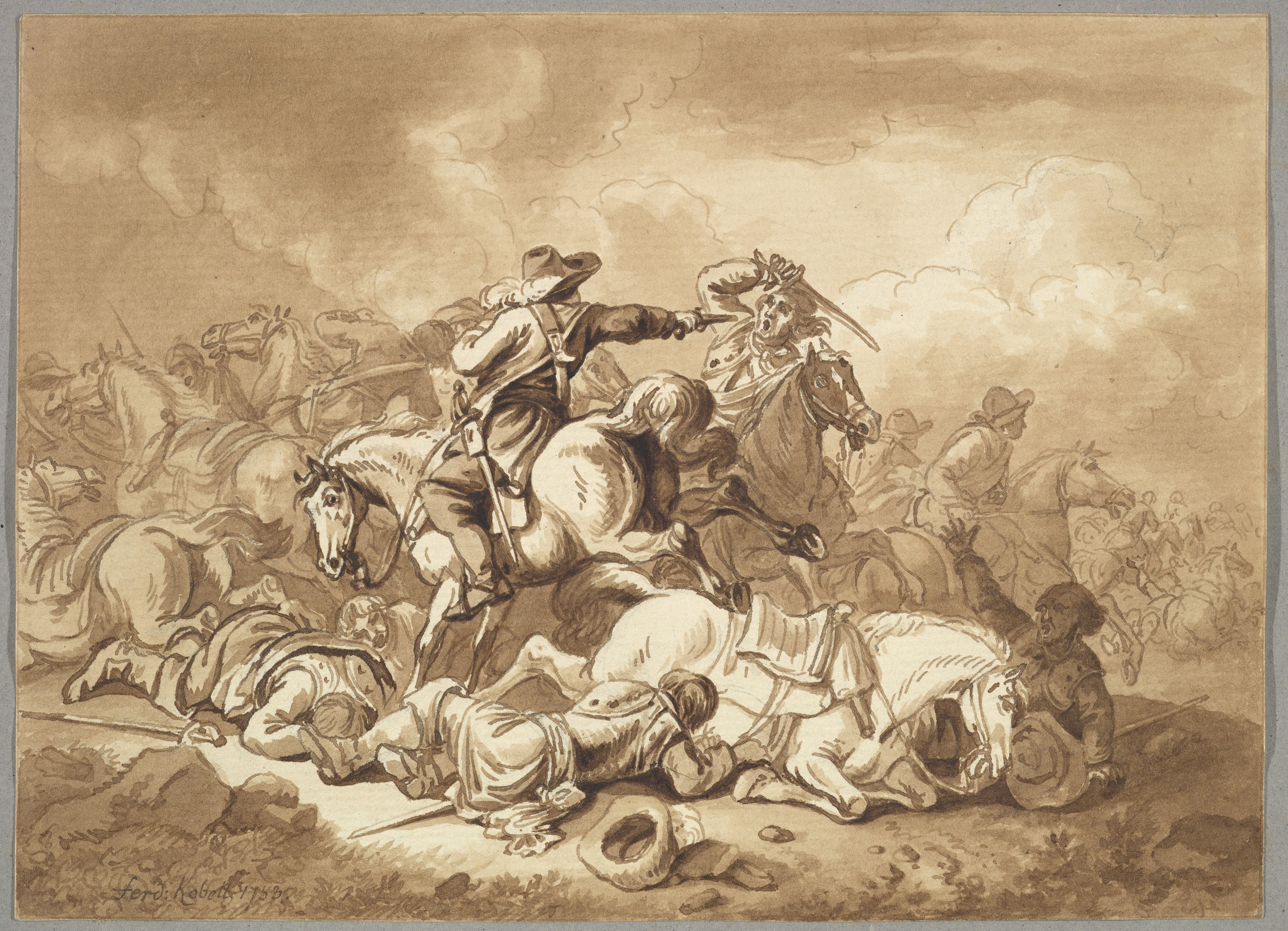
A Battle Scene

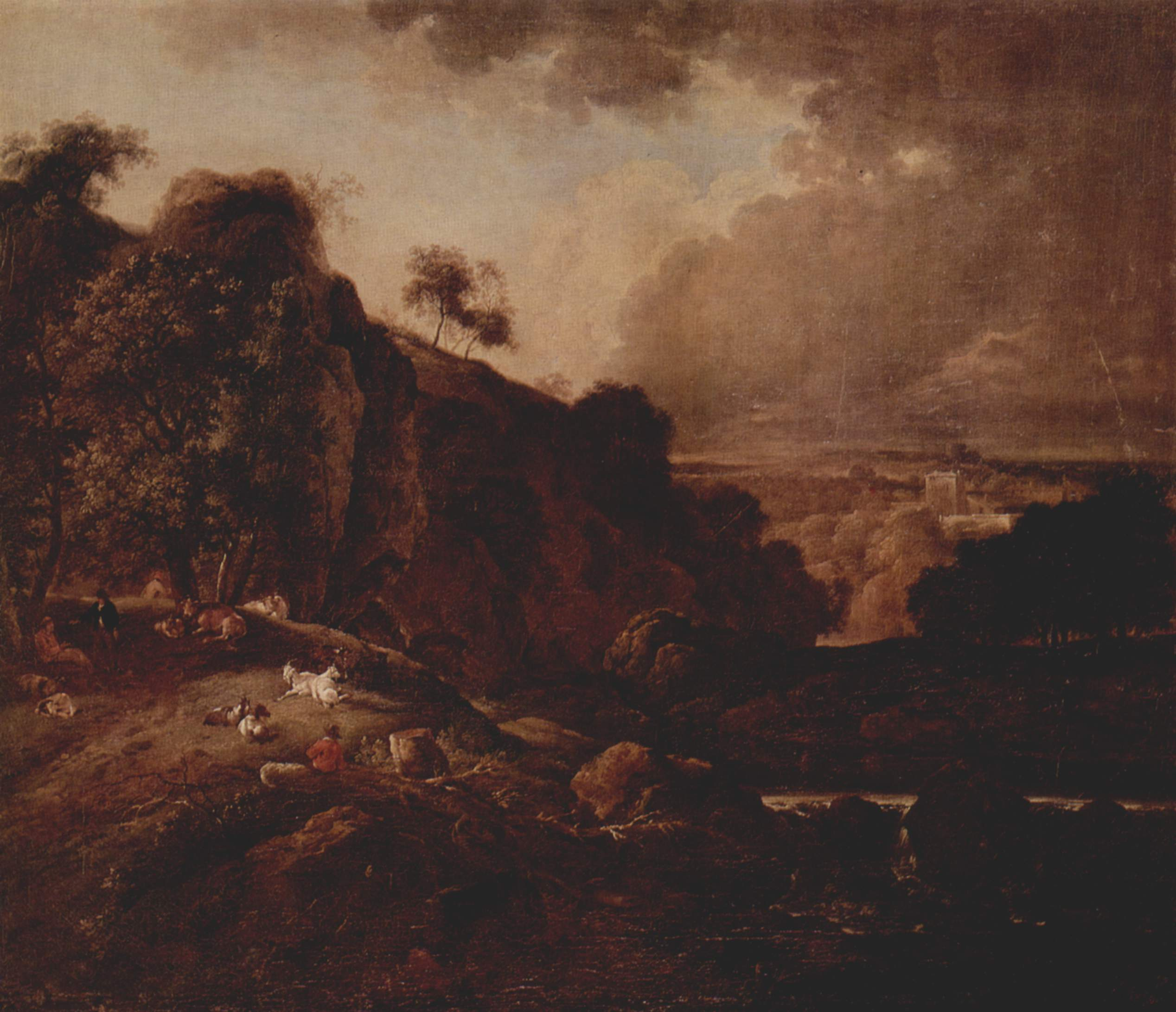
Landscape

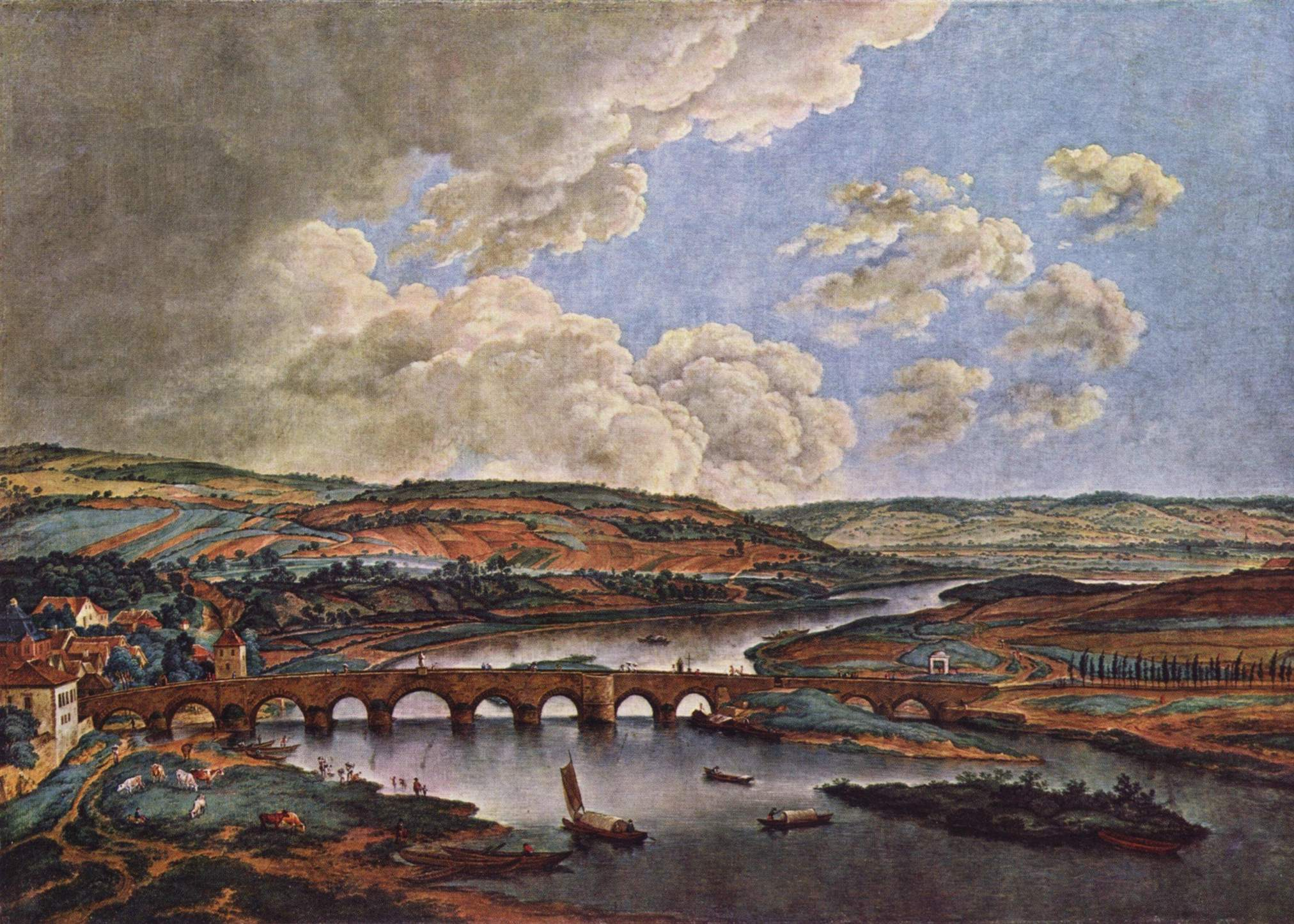
Bridge over the Main at Aschaffenburg

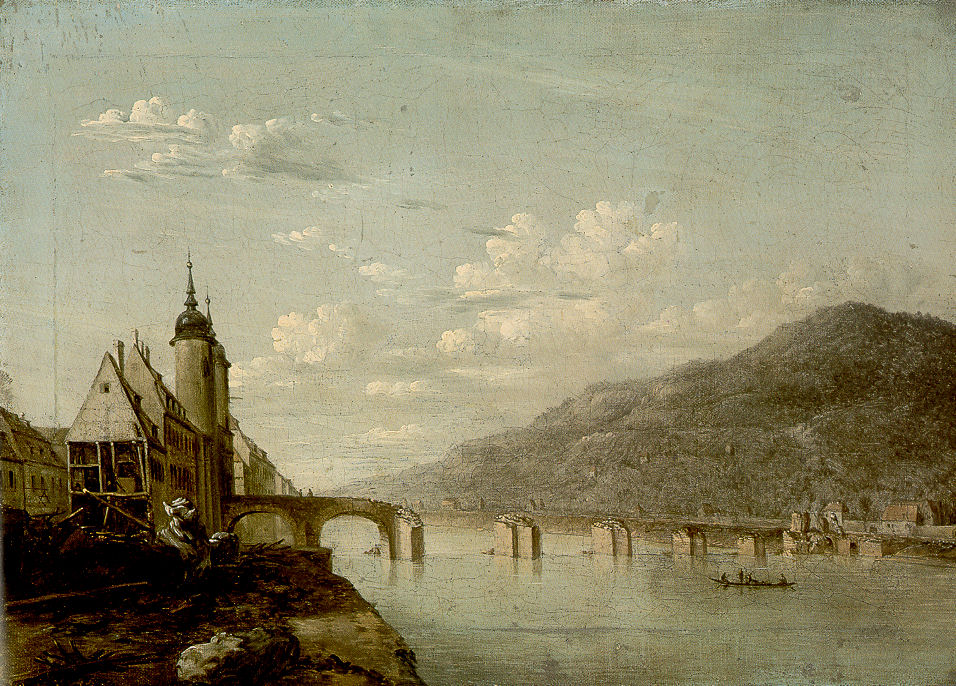
The Old Bridge in Heidelberg

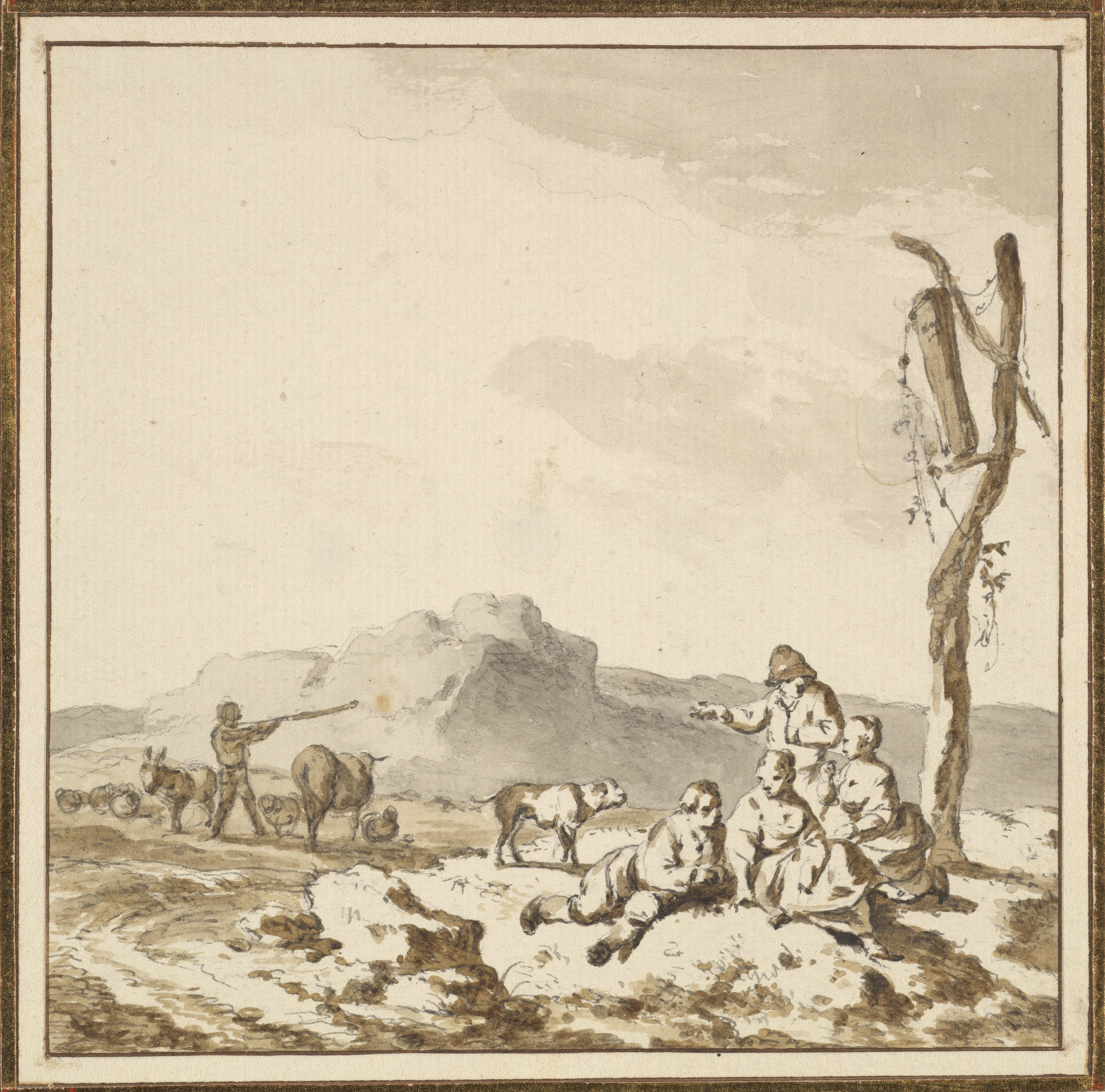
Shepherds at Rest
