= Giovio Series =

Art collection assembled by Paolo Giovio

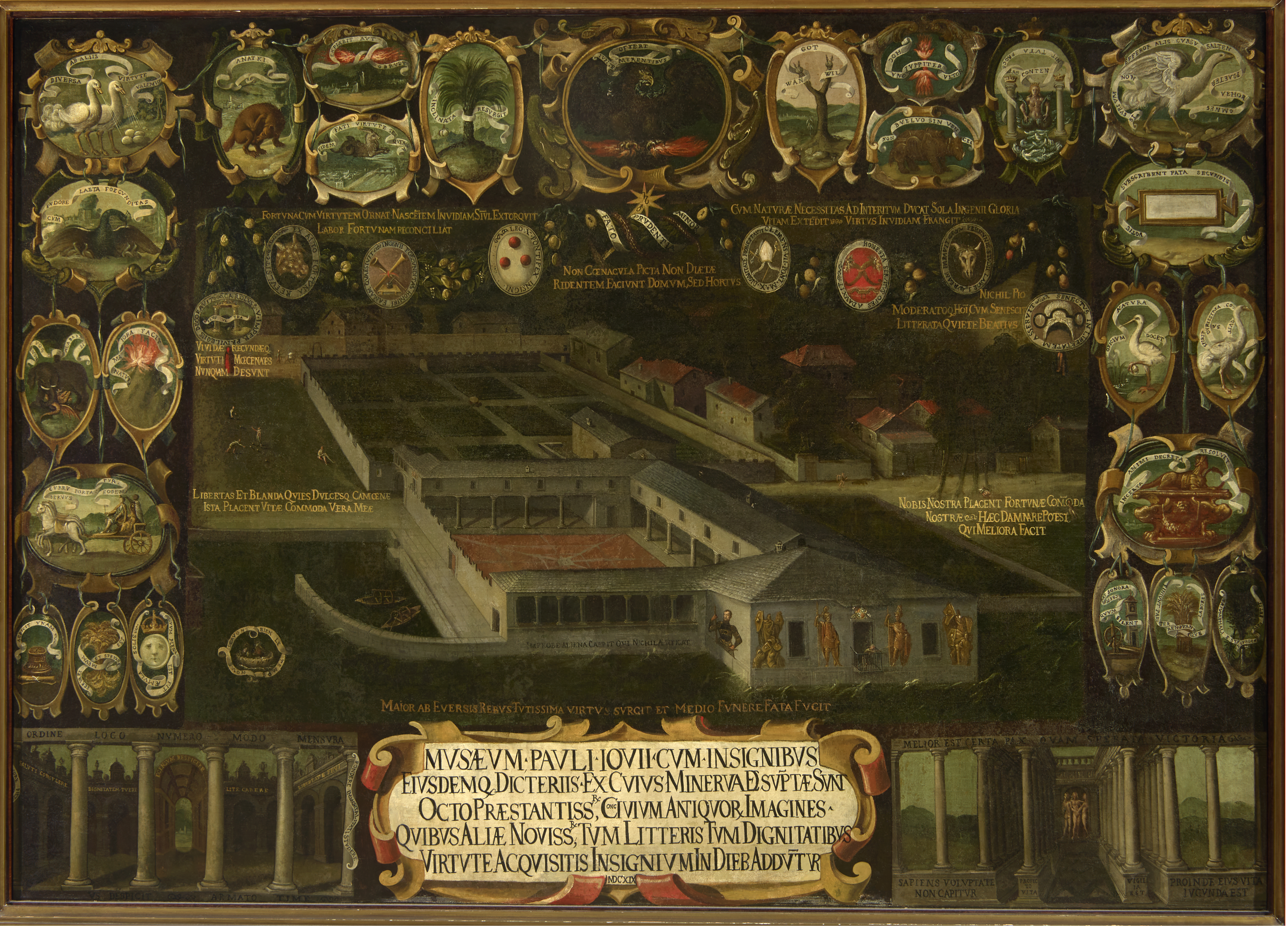
View of the villa of Paolo Giovio in Borgovico, with the Museo Gioviano were the collection was on display.

The Giovio Series, also known as the Giovio Collection or Giovio Portraits, is a series of 484 portraits assembled by the 16th-century Italian Renaissance historian and biographer Paolo Giovio. It includes portraits of literary figures, rulers, statesmen and other dignitaries, many of which were done from life. Intended by Giovio as a public archive of famous men, the collection was originally housed in a specially-built museum on the shore of Lake Como. In 1551, Giovio published notices with biographical text for the portraits, under the title Elogia virorum bellica virtute illustrium (1551), with references but without illustrations. Only 39 paintings remain from the original collection, which are now located in the Pinacoteca Comunale of Como.

== Origins and history ==
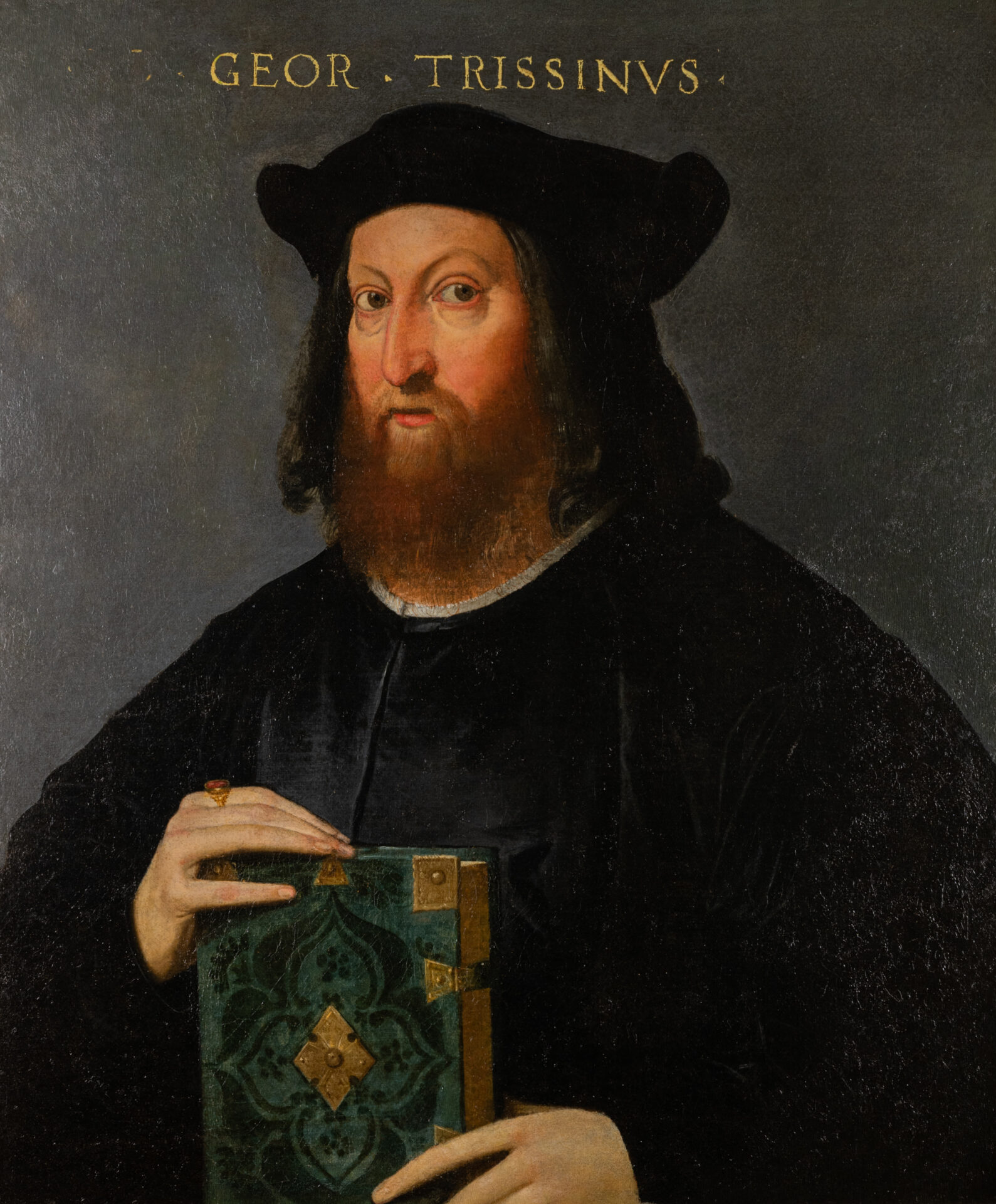
Portrait of Giorgio Trissino (1546). Giovio Series, Pinacoteca Comunale of Como

Giovio first began collecting portraits around 1512, soon after leaving his hometown of Como to pursue his career in Rome. Initially focused on men of letters, the collection grew to include military figures, kings, popes, artists and even a few renowned women. The series included illustrious men of ages past alongside those of his own day. Giovio intended his gallery to serve as a permanent public record, and so was scrupulous about its accuracy. Idealised portraits would not suffice: he preferred portraits drawn from life whenever possible. In the absence of such, likenesses produced from coins, busts, or earlier life portraits were acceptable. Giovio worked zealously to acquire works for his collection, writing to dozens of public figures across Europe and the Near East to solicit portraits. His correspondence reveals that he bargained, cajoled and even bribed subjects for pictures, many of which he paid for himself.

What made Giovio's collection unique was his intent to open it to the public: his 20th century biographer T. C. Price Zimmermann writes that "the idea of founding a portrait museum on the lake was his most original contribution to European civilization." The inspirational value of collections of portraits was a familiar Renaissance trope, consciously revived from Antique precedents: as the humanist Poggio Bracciolini had written in his essay De nobilitate liber, the Romans should be emulated, "for they believed that the images of men who had excelled in the pursuit of glory and wisdom, if placed before the eyes, would help ennoble and stir up the soul." Examples of similar collections can be traced to the early 14th century, and to less universal sets of the "Nine Worthies" and literary reports of the busts of philosophers in Roman libraries, such as Pliny's, to "...images made of bronze... set up in libraries in honour of those whose immortal spirits talk to us in the same places." but none of these was conceived with the express goal of edifying the public. Giovio frequently referred to his project as a templum virtutis, or "temple of virtue", as a reflection of its didactic purpose.

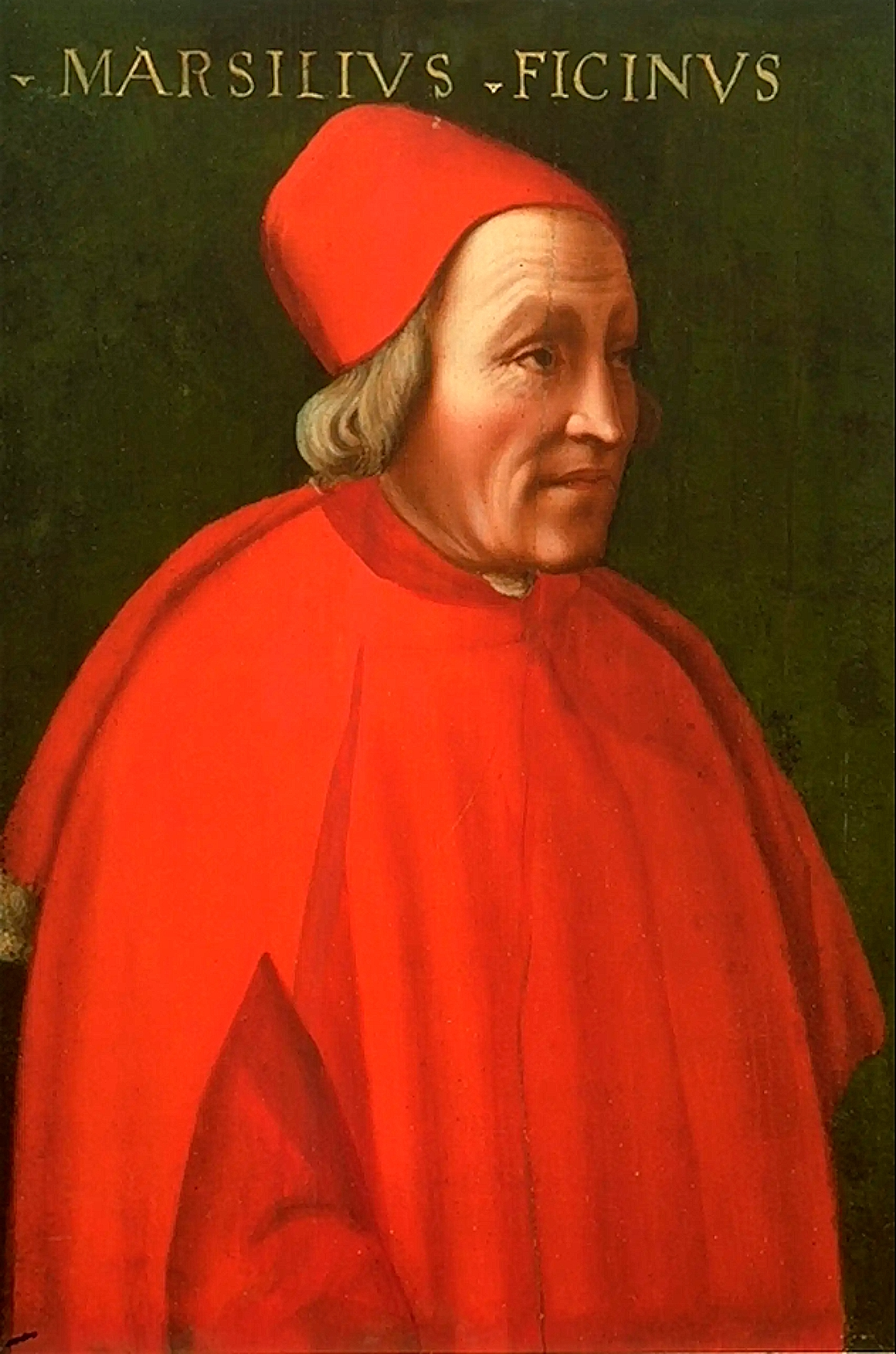
Marsilio Ficino, painted in 1521-1552. Giovio Series, Pinacoteca Comunale of Como

Construction of the museum began in 1537 and was completed in 1543. The portraits were organised into four categories according to the subjects' accomplishments: living writers (including poets and philosophers), dead writers, great artists, and dignitaries such as kings, popes and generals. The pictures were arranged within these groups chronologically according to date of death, or by year of birth if the sitter was still alive. As a finishing touch, Giovio composed brief biographies to accompany the portraits; these were published as Elogia veris clarorum virorum imaginibvs apposita, quae in Mvsaeo Ioviano Comi spectantur (1546) and Elogia virorum bellica virtute illustrium veris imaginibus supposita, quae apud Musaeum spectantur (1551), more commonly known simply as the Elogia. The inclusion of these biographies was fairly innovative. The 1517 Illustrium imagines of the antiquarian Andrea Fulvio, which paired short biographies with woodcut portraits drawn from coins, was one of the few similar contemporary works. The lost Imagines of Varro, an illustrated set of some 700 famous figures of the ancient world, may also have inspired Giovio.

Following Giovio's death in 1552, the original collection was eventually dispersed and lost. Some portraits are kept in the Pinacoteca Civica di Palazzo Volpi in Como. It is largely preserved in a series of copies commissioned that year by Cosimo I de' Medici: artist Cristofano dell'Altissimo spent 37 years copying the portraits, working from 1552 to 1589. These copies have been displayed in the First Corridor of the Uffizi since 1587.

The museum was demolished in 1615, as it was in ruins following floods caused by the lake, and the paintings were dispersed between the two branches of the family.

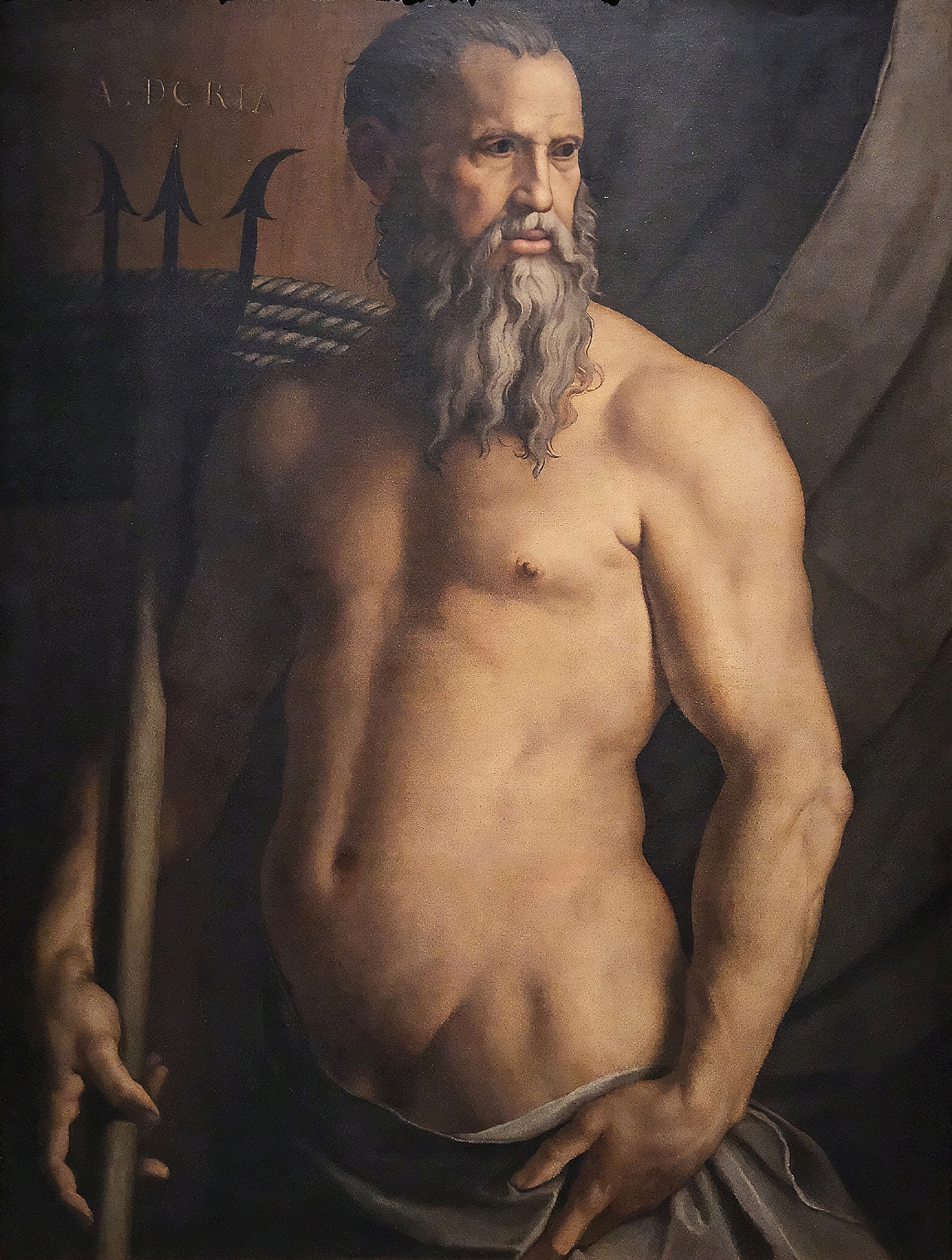
Andrea Doria as Neptune. Bronzino (Agnolo di Cosimo) c. 1545-6. Paolo Giovo collection

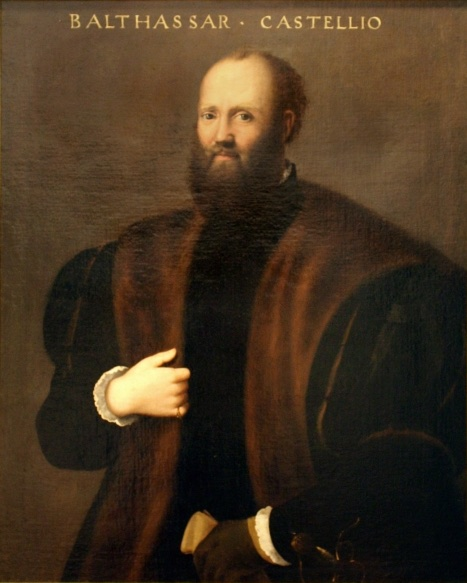
Portrait of Baldassarre Castiglione, by Bernardino Campi

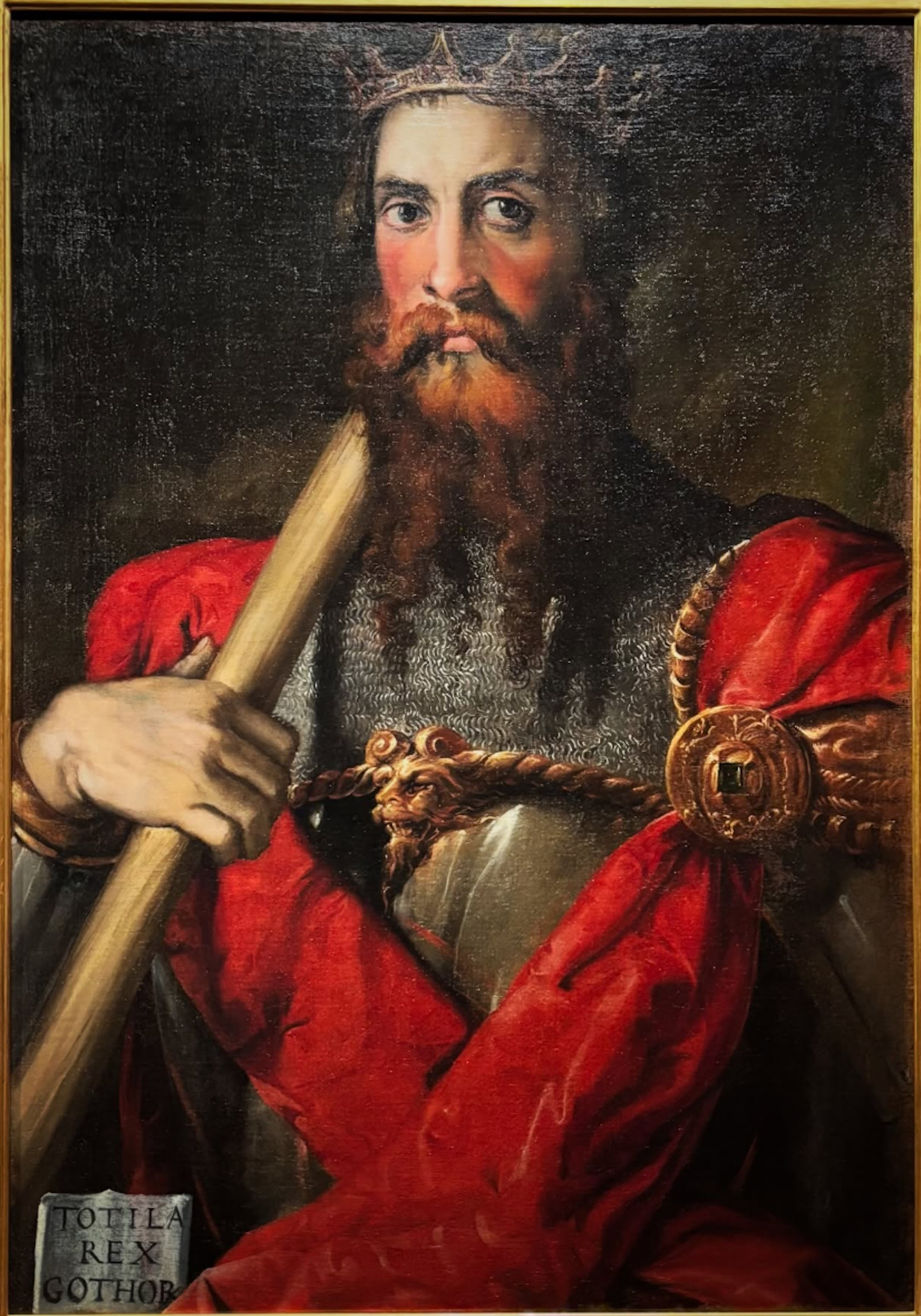
Portrait of Totila by Francesco Salviati, c.1549

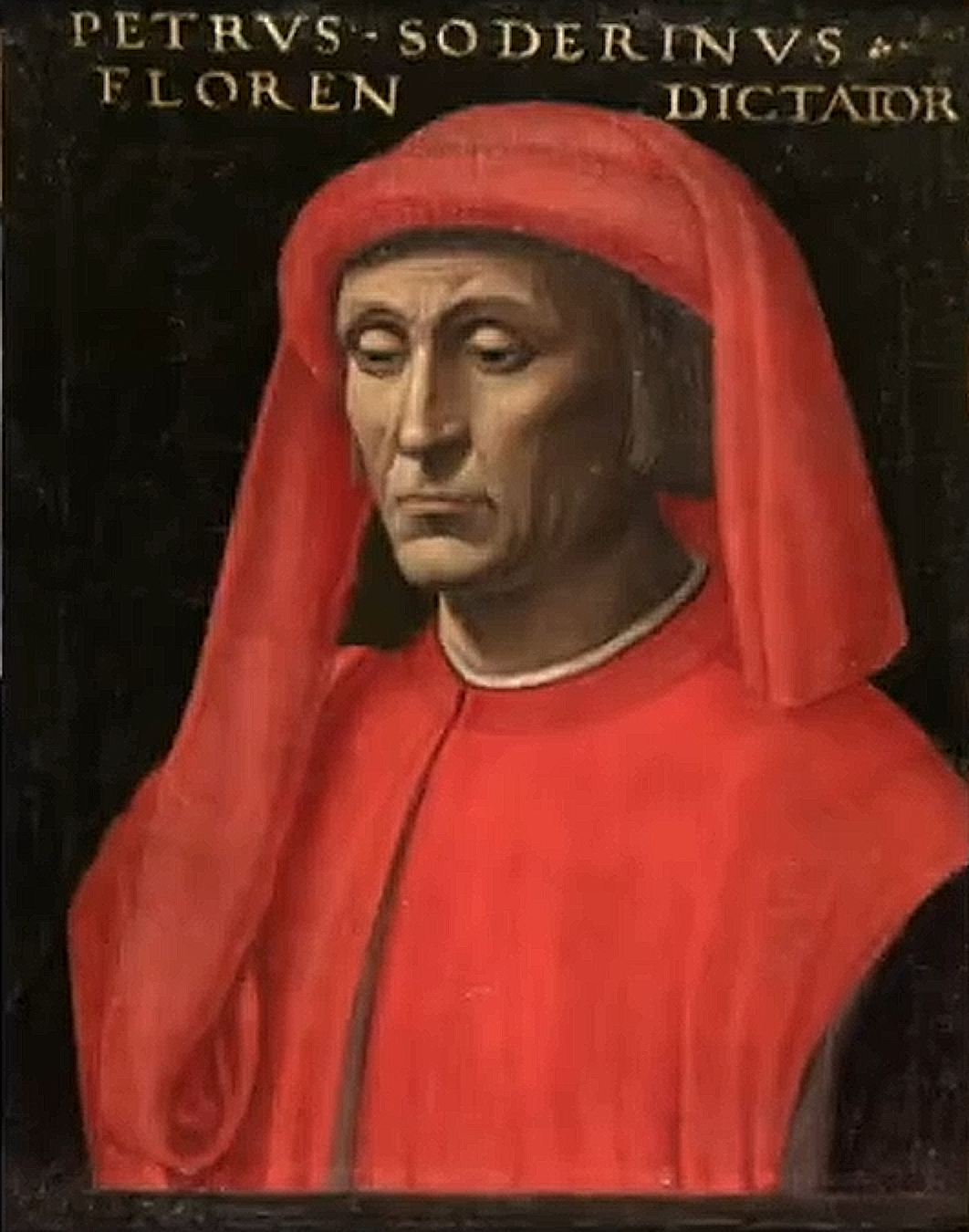
Portrait of Pietro Soderini, painted 1500-1524

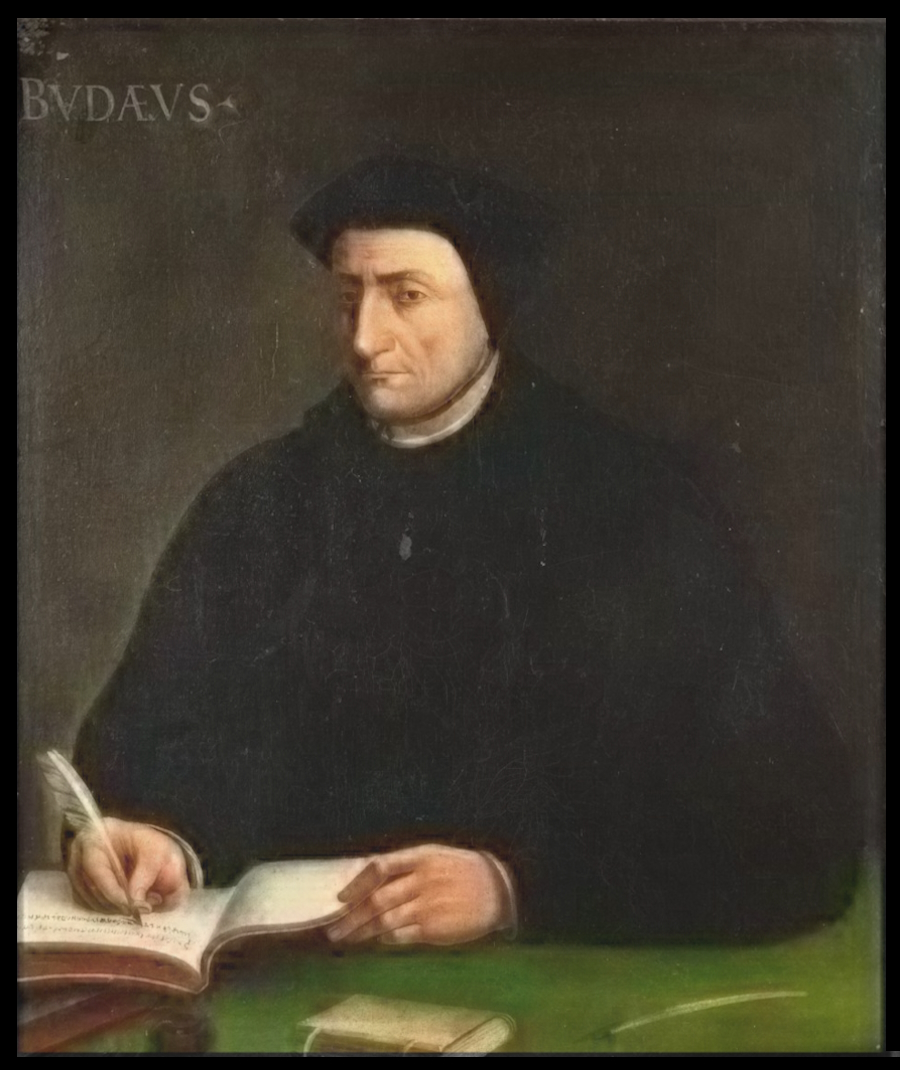
Portrait of Guillaume Budé

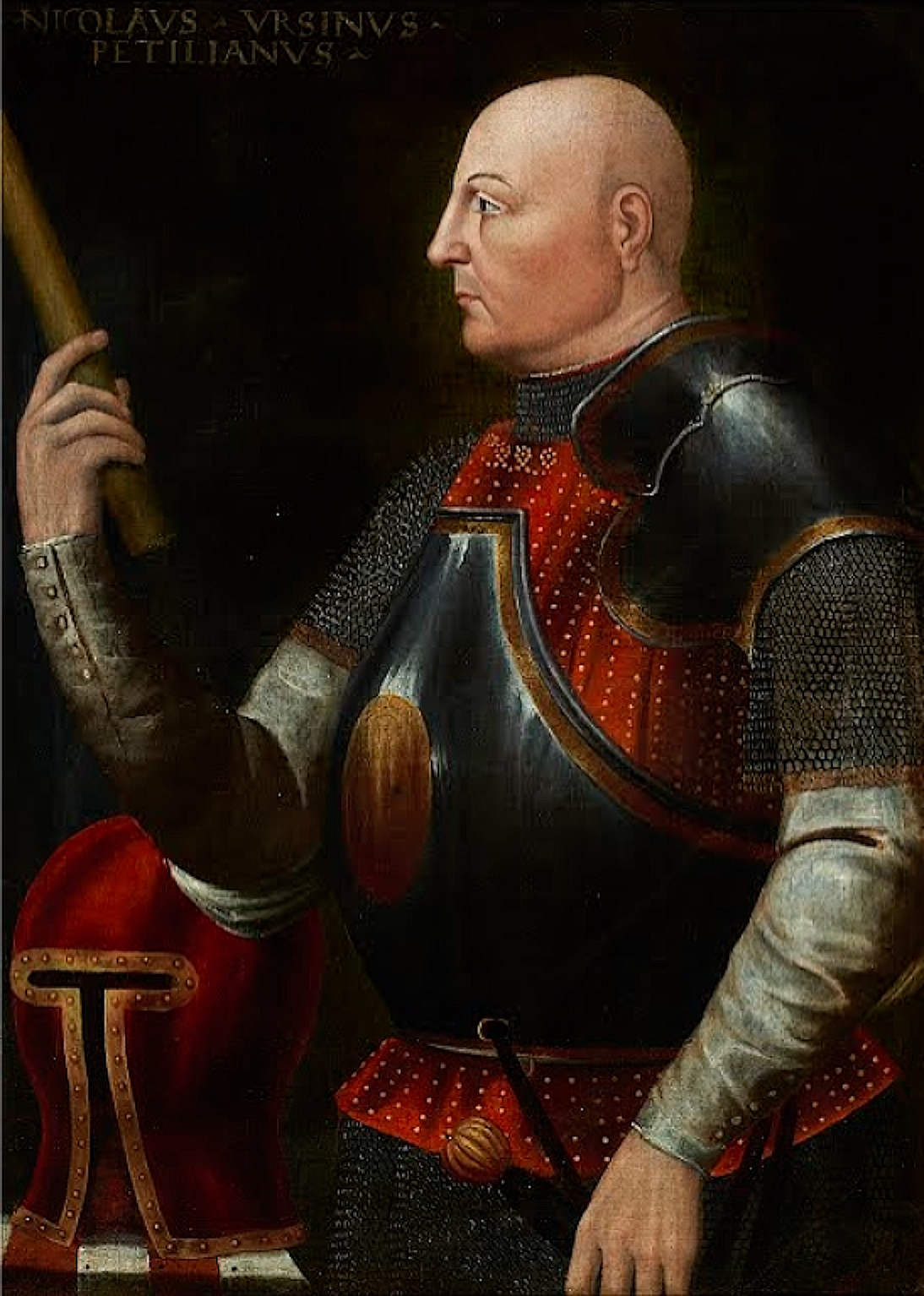
Portrait of Niccolò Orsini

== Copies ==
- An extensive set of copies were made in Como by Cristofano dell'Altissimo for Cosimo I de' Medici from 1552 to 1590, which now have a permanent home in Florence's Uffizi Gallery (the "Serie Gioviana" portraits).
- The Giovio paintings were also reproduced as woodblock illustrations by Tobias Stimmer, who visited the gallery in Como in 1569-1570, in his illustrated edition of Elogia virorum bellica virtute illustrium (1575), compensating for the lack of images in Giovio's 1551 edition.
- Many of Giovio's paintings were also copied at the direction of Ferdinand II, in 1578-1590. They are now in the Coin Cabinet (Kunsthistorisches Museum), numbering about one thousand portraits, a large part of them copied from Giovio.

=== Gallery of copies by Cristofano dell'Altissimo ===
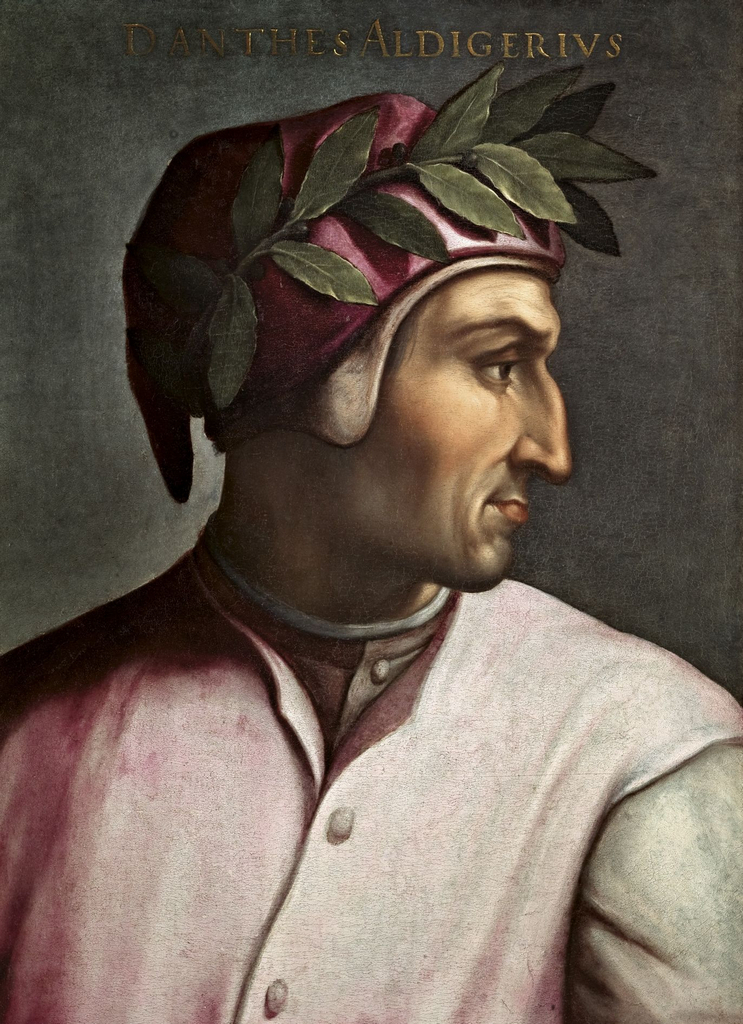
Dante Alighieri (ca.1265–1321)

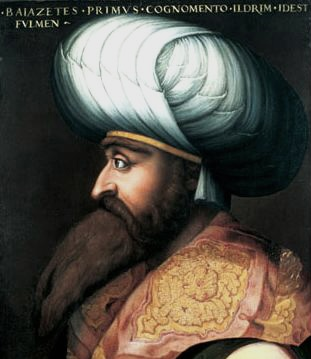
Sultan Bayezid I (ca.1357–1403)

Shah Ismail I Safavi (1487-1524)

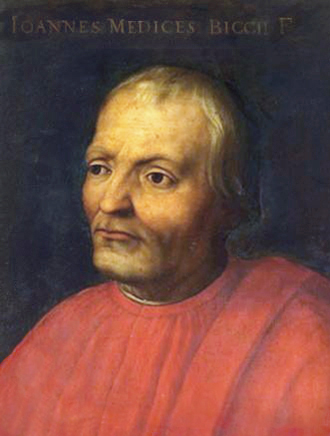
Medici patriarch Giovanni de' Medici (1360–1429)

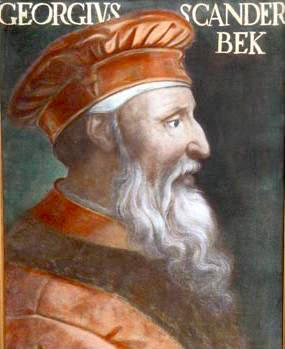
Albanian national hero Skanderbeg (1405–1468)

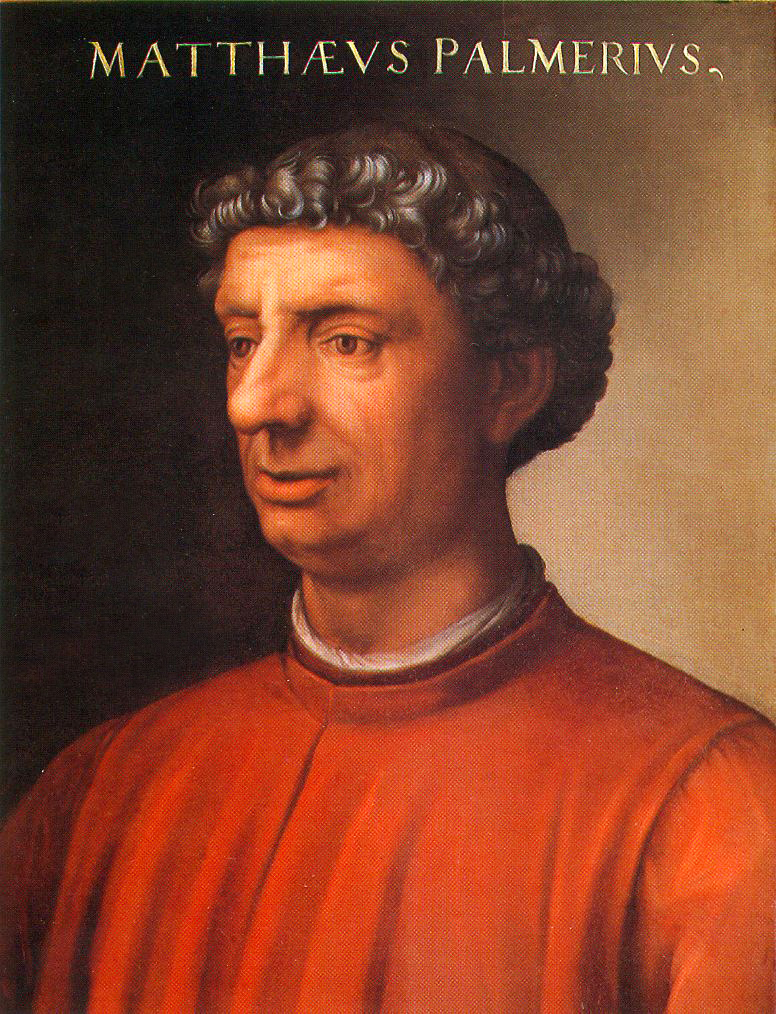
Renaissance humanist Matteo Palmieri (1406–1475)

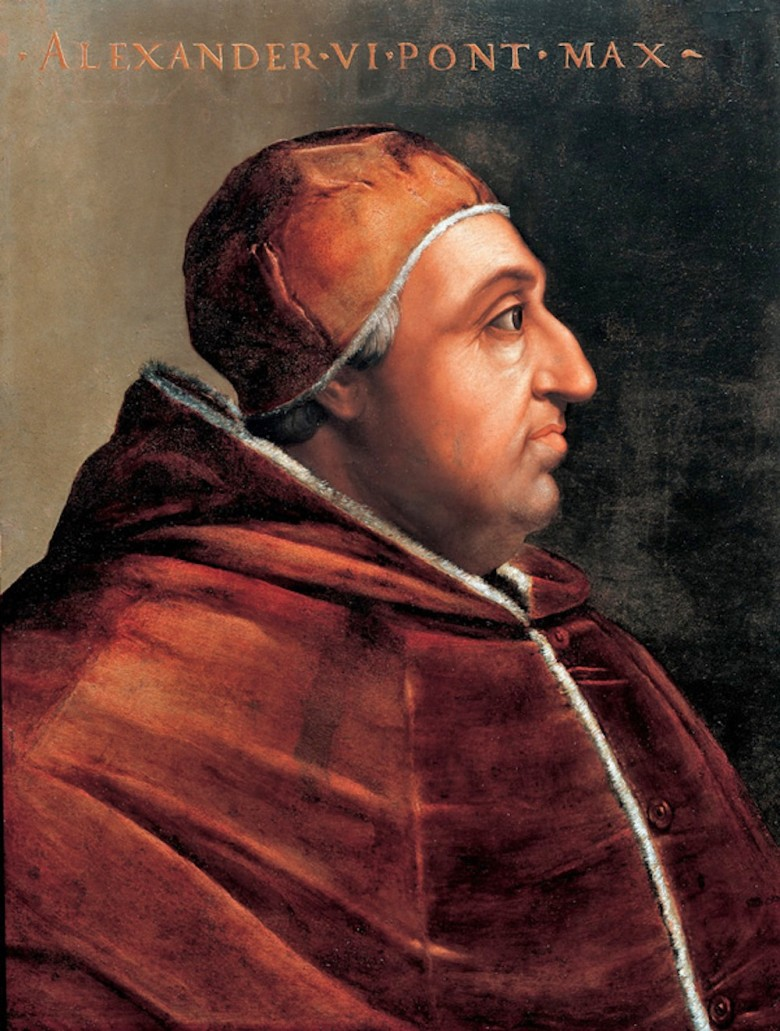
Pope Alexander VI (1431–1503)

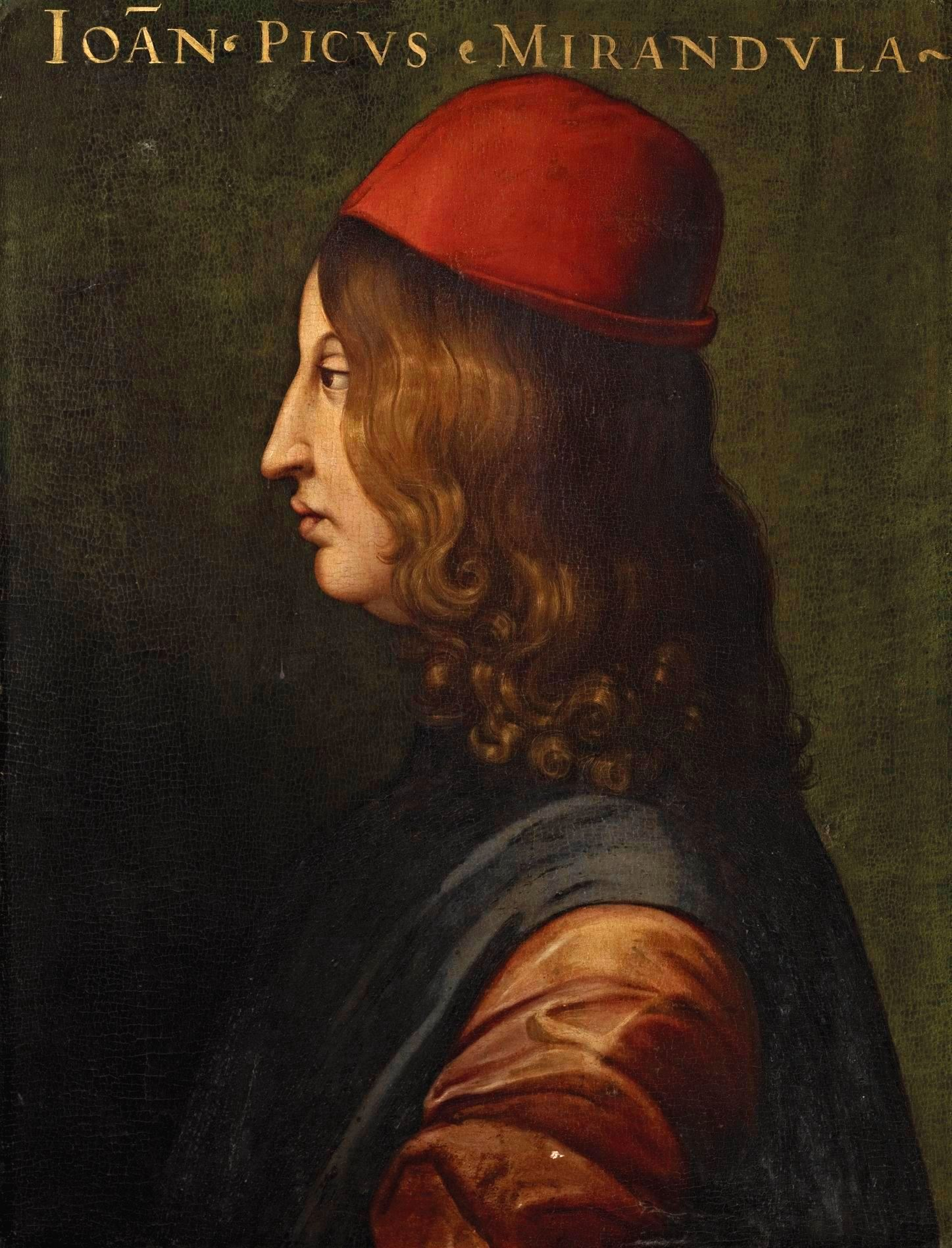
Philosopher Giovanni Pico della Mirandola (1463–1494)

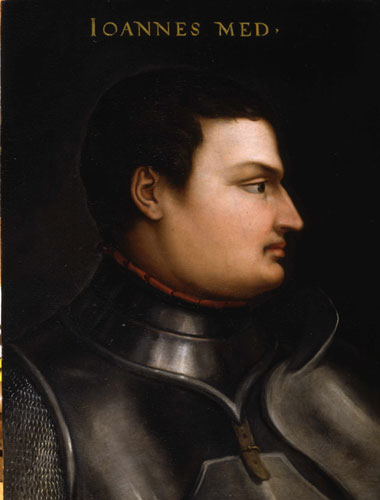
Condottiero Giovanni dalle Bande Nere (1498–1526)

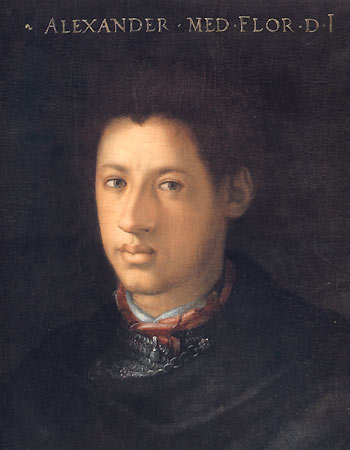
Alessandro de' Medici, Duke of Florence (1510–1537)

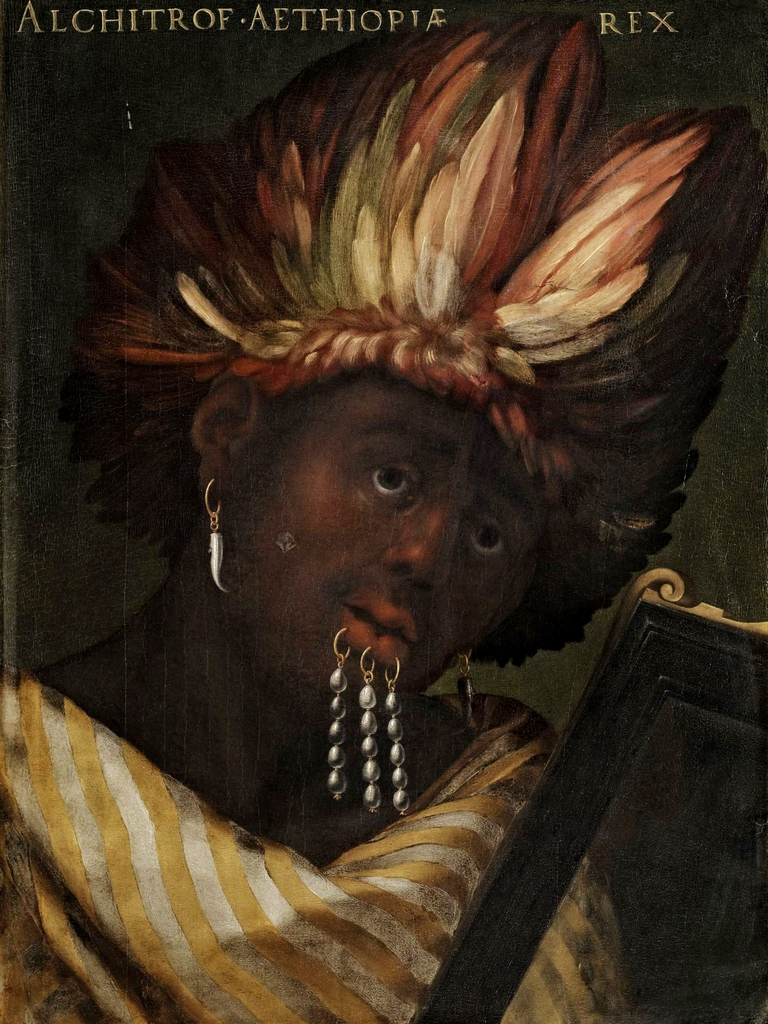
Alchitrof, "Aethiopia Rex", painted in 1568

=== Woodblock copies by Tobias Stimmer (1575) ===
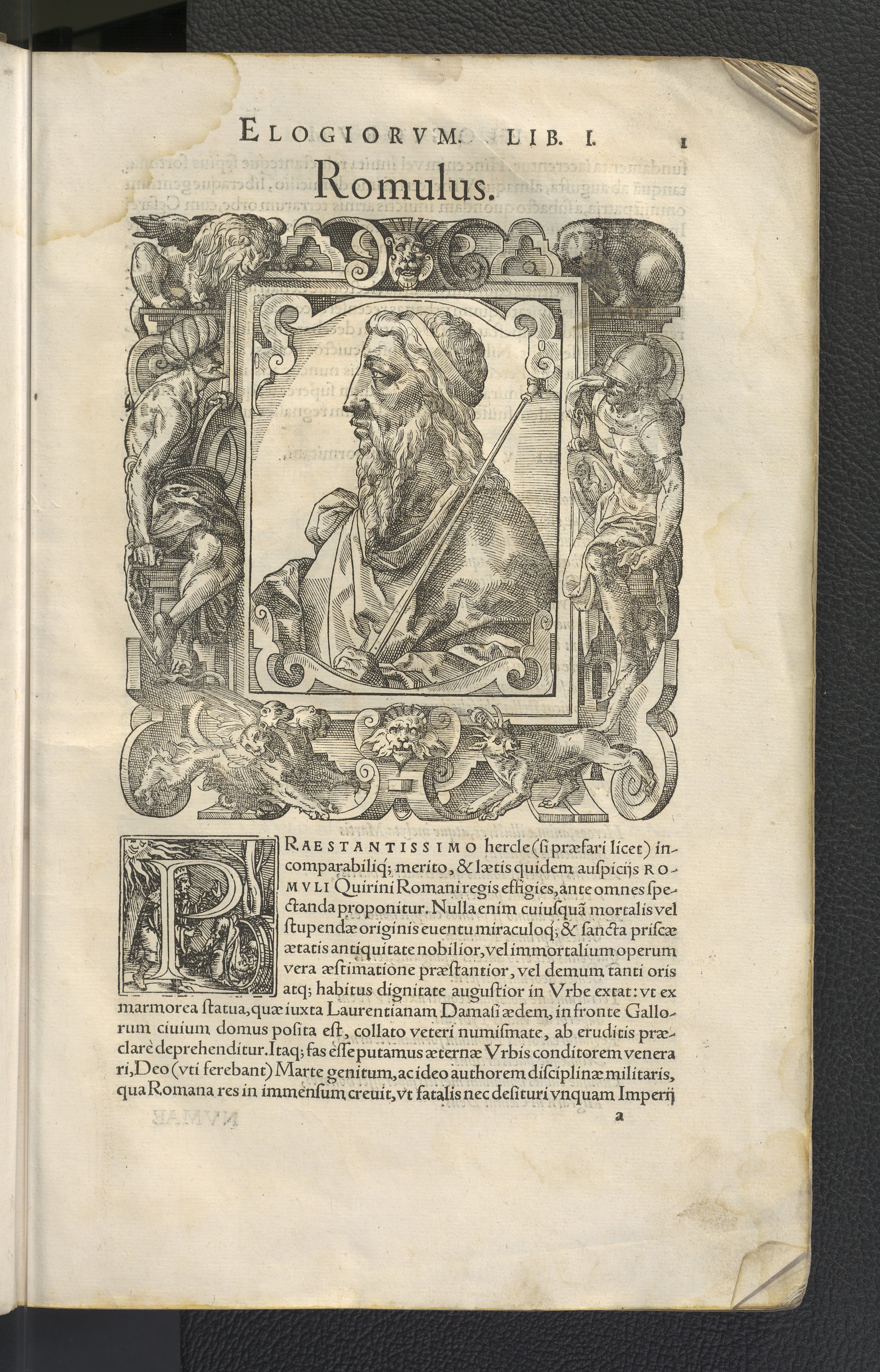
Founder of Rome Romulus

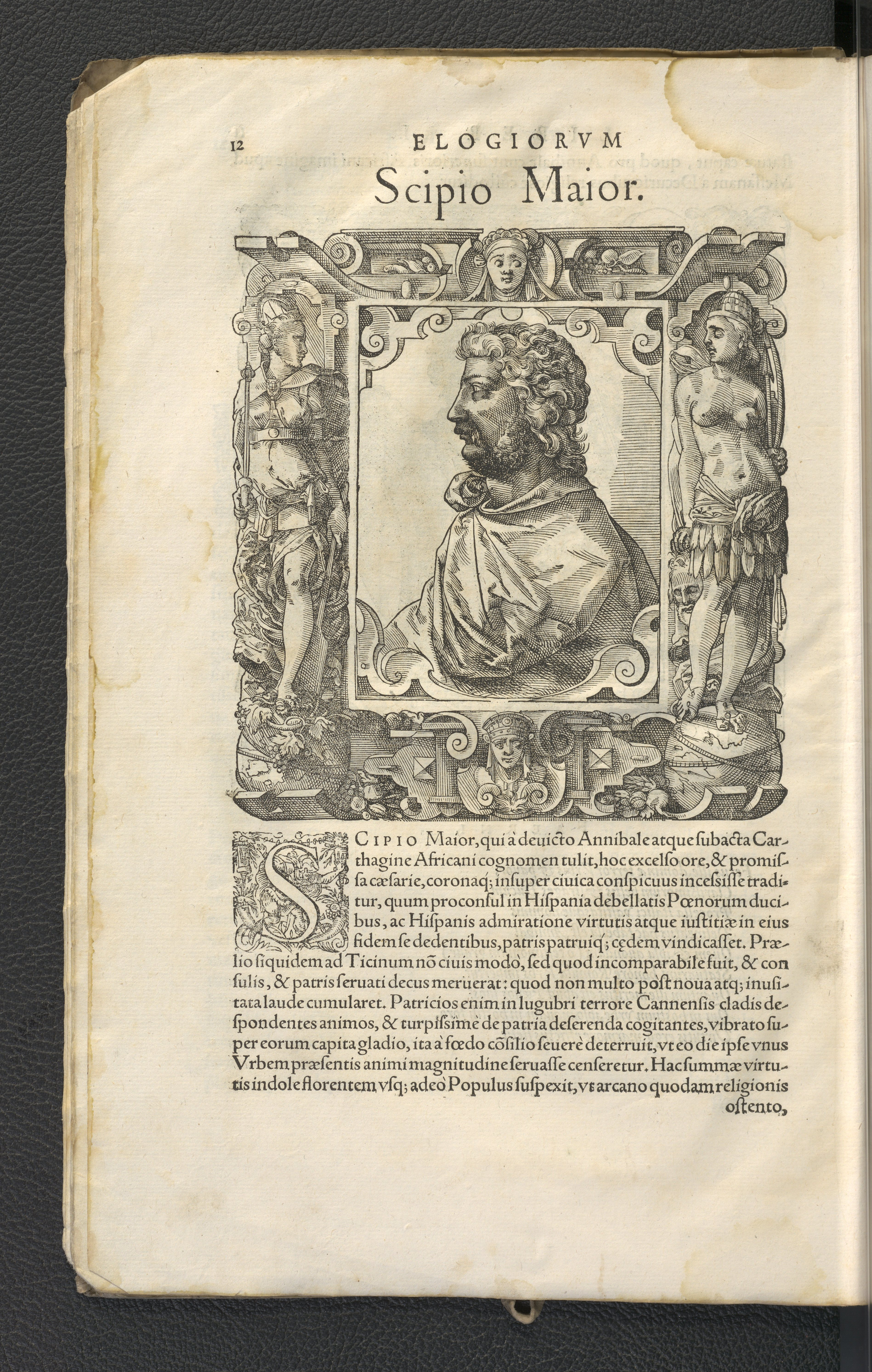
Roman general Scipio Africanus

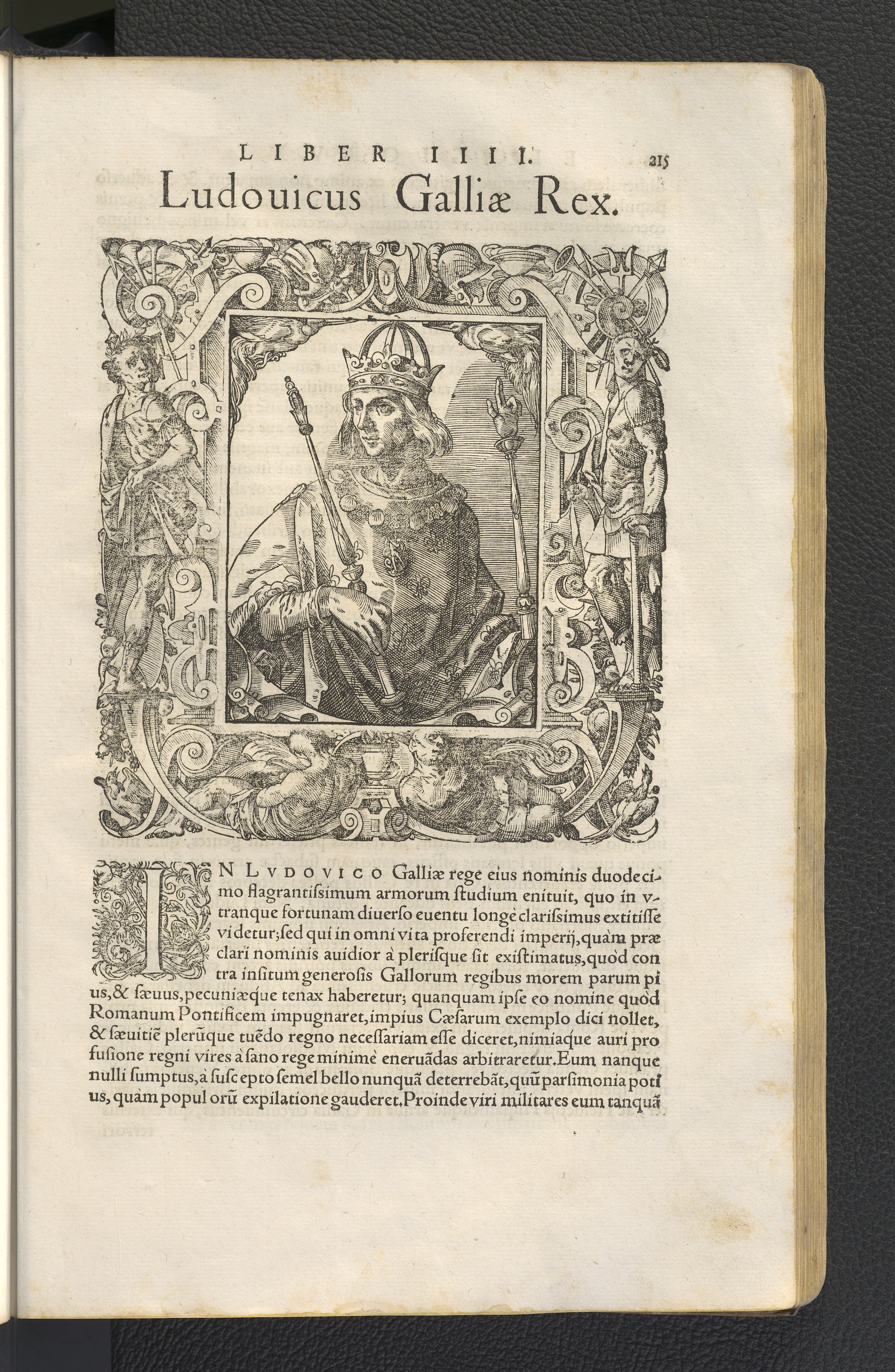
French king Saint Louis

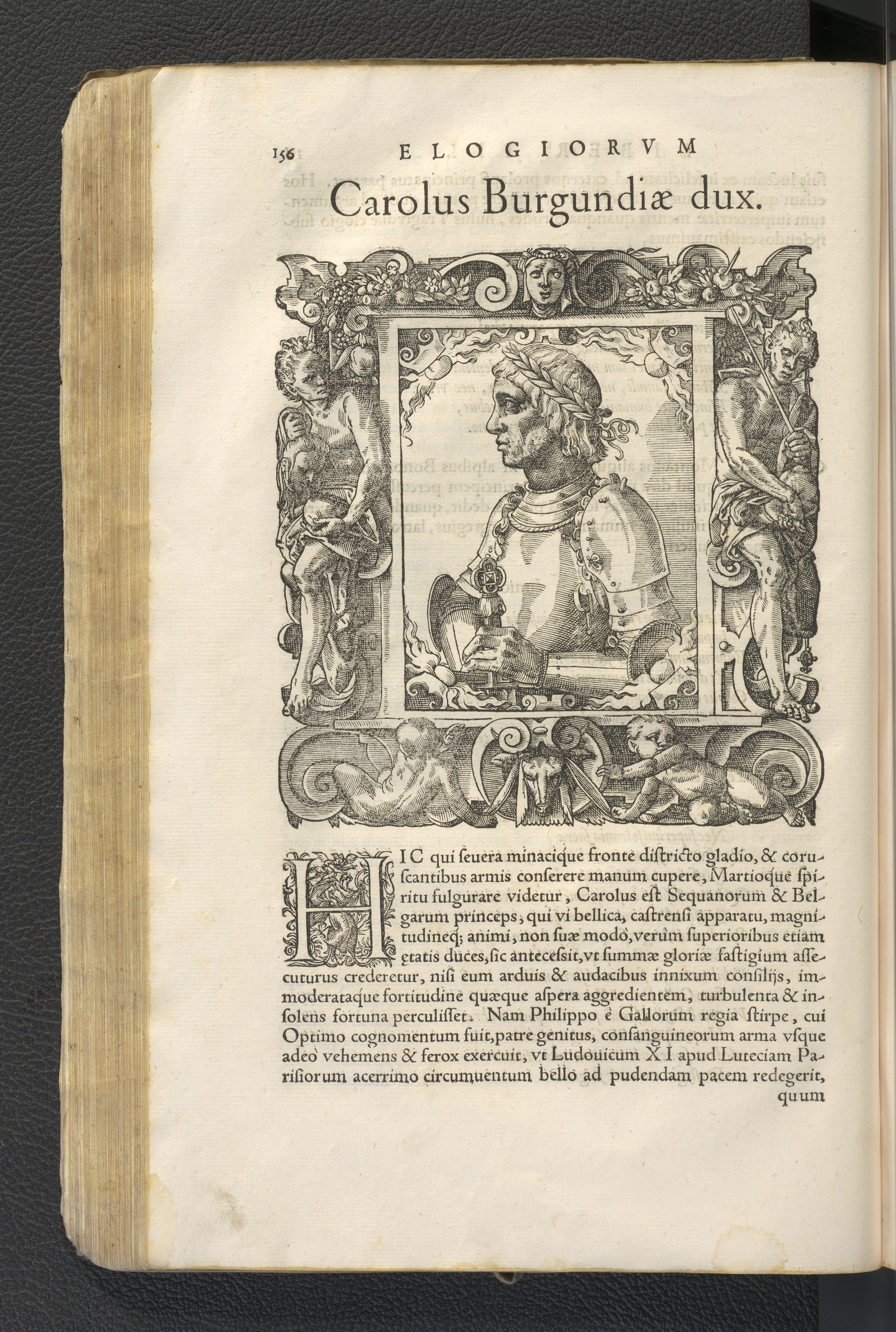
Charles, Duke of Burgundy

== Bibliography ==
- Aleci, Linda Kinger. "Images of Identity: Italian Portrait Collections of the Fifteenth and Sixteenth Centuries." "The Image of the Individual: Portraits in the Renaissance" Eds. Nicholas Mann and Luke Syson. London: British Museum Press, 1998. 67–79.
- Campbell, Lorne. Renaissance Portraits: European Portrait-Painting in the 14th, 15th and 16th Centuries. New Haven: Yale University Press, 1990.
- Fossi, Gloria. Uffizi Gallery: Art, History, Collections. Firenze: Firenze Musei, 2001.
- Giovio, Paolo. An Italian Portrait Gallery. Translated by Florence Alden Gragg. Boston: Chapman & Grimes, 1935.
- Haskell, Francis. History and its Images: Art and the Interpretation of the Past. Yale University Press. 1995. ISBN 0-300-05949-3, ISBN 978-0-300-05949-6
- Müntz, Eugène. "Le Musée de portraits de Paul Jove. Contributions pour servir à l’iconographie du moyen âge et de la renaissance," Mémoires de l'Institut nationale de France, Académie des inscriptions et belles-lettres (in French), Vol. 36, no. 2, 1900. 249–343.
- Zimmermann, T. C. Price. Paolo Giovio: The Historian and the Crisis of Sixteenth-Century Italy. Princeton, NJ: Princeton University Press, 1995.
