= Alchitrof =

1568 painting by Cristofano dell'Altissimo

Alchitrof is the name of a 1568 painting by Cristofano dell'Altissimo that depicts an Aethiopian king.

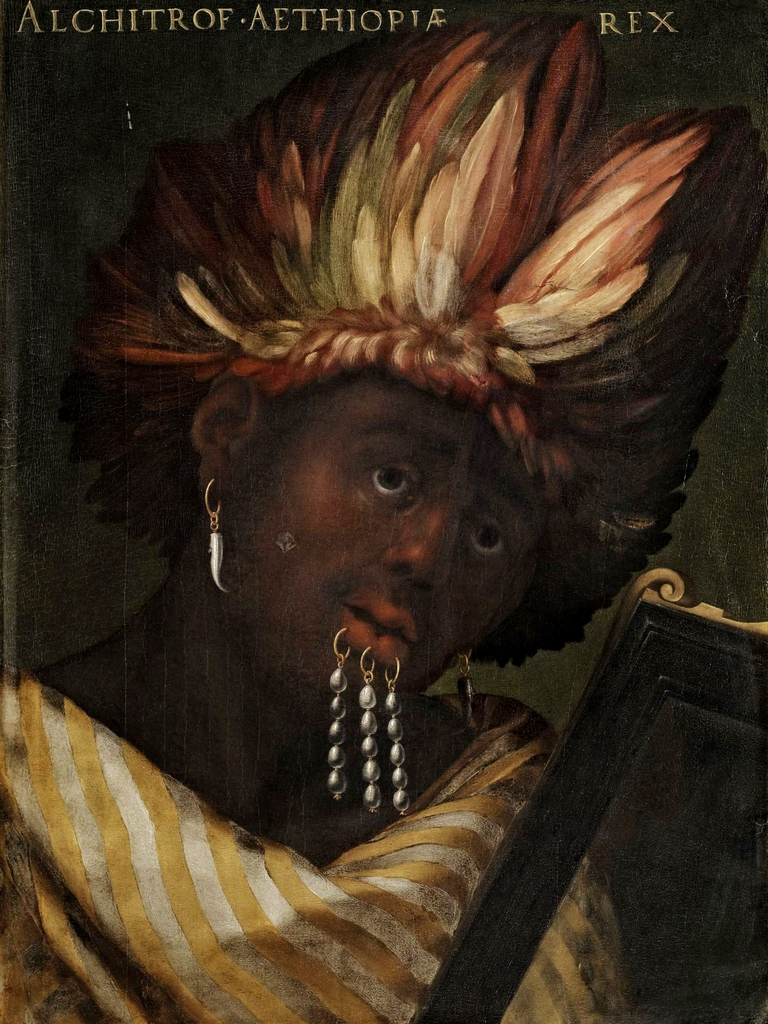
Alchitrof, "Aethiopia Rex", depicted in a 1568 painting by Cristofano dell'Altissimo.

== Background ==
16th century Italian historian and biographer Paolo Giovio (1483–1552) assembled a series of 484 portraits, known as the Giovio Series. These portraits included, but were not limited to, rulers, statesmen and literary figures. Much of the original collection is now lost, but it is preserved in a series of at least 280 copies made by the Italian painter Cristofano dell'Altissimo (c. 1525–1605). From the surviving copies by Cristifano, two portraits are of Ethiopian monarchs. The first of these was of Emperor Lebna Dengel (r. 1508–1540) while the other was of a king named "Alchitrof".

== Historicity ==
Alchitrof is not named in any Ethiopian regnal lists. The portrait of Alchitrof includes a feathered headdress and three rings on his lower lip, features which do not match with what is known about Ethiopian custom and culture during the period when the portrait was painted. It is possible that "Alchitrof" is not meant to be real person but rather "a fantastic approach" from a European perspective.

Kate Lowe, a professor of Renaissance history, suggested that the name "Alchitrof" may be a corruption of the name of Lebna Dengel's eldest son al-Fiqtur. Lowe also suggested there may be a "mismatch" between the image and its inscription, as the clothing and jewellery are often used in reference to South America rather than Sub-Saharan Africa in Renaissance art. Additionally, Lowe argued that "Achitrof" may be an "imagined Brazilian, Carib or Amerindian chief or ruler" with his facial features being inspired by "more realistic physiognomic features taken from black Africans in Europe".

Alternatively, Alchitrof may not have been a king in the modern-day territory of Ethiopia, but rather that the term "Aethiopia" that is used refers to a more generalized region covering much of Sub-Saharan Africa and thus Alchitrof, if he existed, may have been king of a totally different geographical region to that of Lebna Dengel. The modern-day region of Ethiopia was frequently called "Abyssinia" by the Europeans at the time the painting was made and the painting of Lebna Dengel specifically calls him the "Great King of the Abyssinians" instead of "Aethiopia" as used in the portrait of Alchitrof, suggesting that the original artist (or copier) deliberately chose to differentiate their regions of rule. Dr. Emil Krén and Dr. Daniel Marx suggested that Alchitrof did not look "Ethiopian" because Aethiopia extended into modern-day Tanzania.

== See also ==
- Cristofano dell'Altissimo
- Giovio Series
