= Antonio Sant'Elia =

Italian architect (1888–1916)

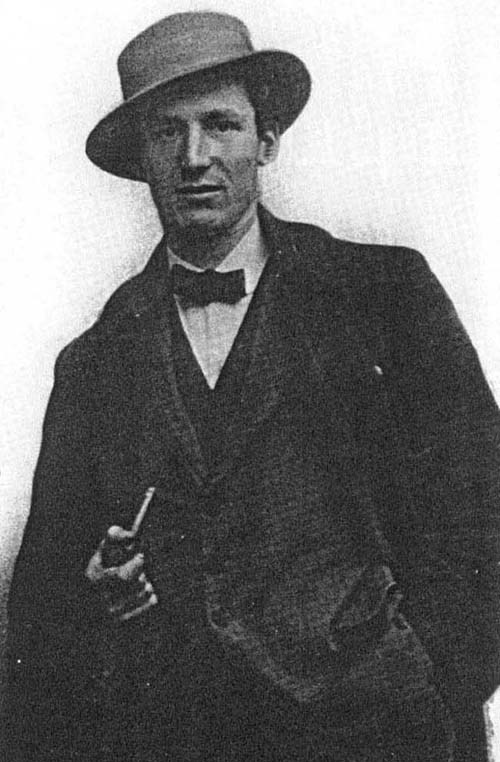
- Antonio Sant'Elia in his twenties in Milan, c. 1908-16
- Born: 30 April 1888; Como, Lombardy, Italy
- Died: 10 October 1916 (aged 28); Gorizia, Austrian Littoral, Austria-Hungary
- Occupation: Architect

Antonio Sant'Elia (Italian pronunciation: [anˈtɔːnjo santeˈliːa]; 30 April 1888 – 10 October 1916) was an Italian architect and a key member of the Futurist movement in architecture. He left behind almost no completed works of architecture and is primarily remembered for his bold sketches and influence on modern architecture.

== Early years ==
Antonio Sant'Elia was born in Como, Lombardy, Italy. He came from a middle-class family. His father, Luigi Sant'Elia, worked as a hairdresser before becoming a city councilor, while his mother, Cristina Panzillo, played a significant role in his personal life. Antonio was the middle child of his family, his older sister Giuseppina (born in 1884) and his younger brother Guido (born in 1891); both of his siblings lived longer than Antonio.

At the age of 15, he attended a local professional high school (Istituto Gabriele Castellini) to study construction. Then he went to Brera Academy in Milan with Giuseppe Mentessi and finally went to the University of Bologna, where he graduated in architecture in 1912. The same year, he opened a design office in Milan, Italy, and got involved with the Futurist movement after meeting with Filippo Tommaso Marinetti.

== Writing ==
The Manifesto of Futurist Architecture was published in Lacerba in August 1914. It has been attributed to Sant'Elia, though some historians dispute this. In it, the author states that "The decorative value of Futurist architecture depends solely on the use and original arrangement of raw or bare or violently colored materials". Sant'Elia's vision consisted in an industrialized and mechanized city of the future, which he saw not as a conglomerate of individual buildings but a vast, multi-level, interconnected and integrated urban conurbation designed around the "life" of the city.

== Work ==
Between 1912 and 1914, influenced by the United States urban landscape as well as by architects such as Otto Wagner, Adolf Loos, and Renzo Picasso, Sant'Elia started working on a series of sketches for a futurist "Città Nuova" ("New City") designed to symbolize a new age. Many of his drawings were exhibited at the only show of the Nuove Tendenze group (of which he was a member) in May-June 1914 at the Famiglia Artistica gallery in Milan. Today, about 170 of his works on paper are on permanent display as part of the collection of Pinacoteca Civica di Palazzo Volpi, Como. Sant'Elia's work featured vast monolithic skyscraper buildings with terraces, bridges, and aerial walkways that embodied the sheer excitement of modern architecture and technology. His monumentalism, however, was also influenced by Art Nouveau architect Giuseppe Sommaruga.

One of Antonio Sant'Elia's most influential works, La Città Nuova, presented a radical rethinking of urban life. He envisioned cities filled with towering structures, layered transportation systems, and integrated power plants, emphasizing the growing importance of electricity and industrial infrastructure in shaping modern life. In this way, he was among the first architects to incorporate the power plant as a central architectural element. Despite the innovation of his ideas, much of his work was considered too advanced for the technological capabilities of his time, which limited the realization of his visionary designs and prevented them from being fully appreciated or implemented in contemporary urban planning.

== Father of Futurist architecture ==
Before joining the Futurist movement, Sant'Elia's drawings were more traditional, focusing on human figures and buildings with conventional forms. However, in 1914, when he became involved with Futurism, his perspective on the world and architecture changed dramatically. The Futurist movement believed that "the past is a good place to look for ideas, but the future isn't a good place to look for future ideas." Sant'Elia's vision of architecture changed by modernity, technology, and dynamism;he began to imagine utopian cities, often portraying monumental, industrialized environments that reflect both optimism and anxiety about the future.

Beyond his architectural work, Sant'Elia was politically and socially engaged. In July 1914, he was elected as a town councilor of socialist opposition in Como, Italy, and actively campaigned for socialist causes in his hometown. Despite this, after his death, he was promoted by Filippo Tommaso Marinetti as both a leading figure of Futurist architecture and a misrepresented Fascist hero. However, Sant'Elia himself never supported Fascism, highlighting a contrast between his personal beliefs and how his legacy was later interpreted.

== War ==
When World War I broke out on July 28, 1914. Italy joined later on May 24, 1915. Sant'Elia and other futurists such as Mario Sironi, Umberto Boccioni, and Marinetti joined the volunteer battalion of the Italian army. Sant'Elia became a second lieutenant in November 1915 and was wounded in July 1916, receiving a silver medal for his bravery. During his service, he was tasked with designing a war cemetery called the Cemetery of Monza for fallen soldiers. On October 10, 1916, he was killed during the Eighth Battle of the Isonzo near Gorizia at just 28 years old.He was later buried in the cemetery he designed.

== Legacy ==
Approximately 170 of his paper compositions are currently on permanent display at the Pinacoteca Civica di Palazzo Volpi in Como. There aren't many instances of his architectural creations. A war memorial in Como and the Villa Elisi in San Maurizio (now Brunate) are two examples. Sant'Elia's utopian vision and architecture had a significant impact on succeeding generations.

Among those works are Villa Elisi in San Maurizio (nowadays a subdivision of Brunate), and a War Memorial in Como. The latter was completed by Giuseppe Terragni in 1933. Though most of Sant'Elia's designs were never realized, his utopian vision turned out to be quite influential for generations to come. Sant'Elia is often cited as a precursor to architects such as John Portman and Helmut Jahn. The production design of dystopian films like Fritz Lang's 1927 Metropolis and Ridley Scott's 1982 Hollywood movie Blade Runner is also indebted to Sant'Elia's ideas.

== Works ==
- La Città Nuova, 1914

== Image gallery ==
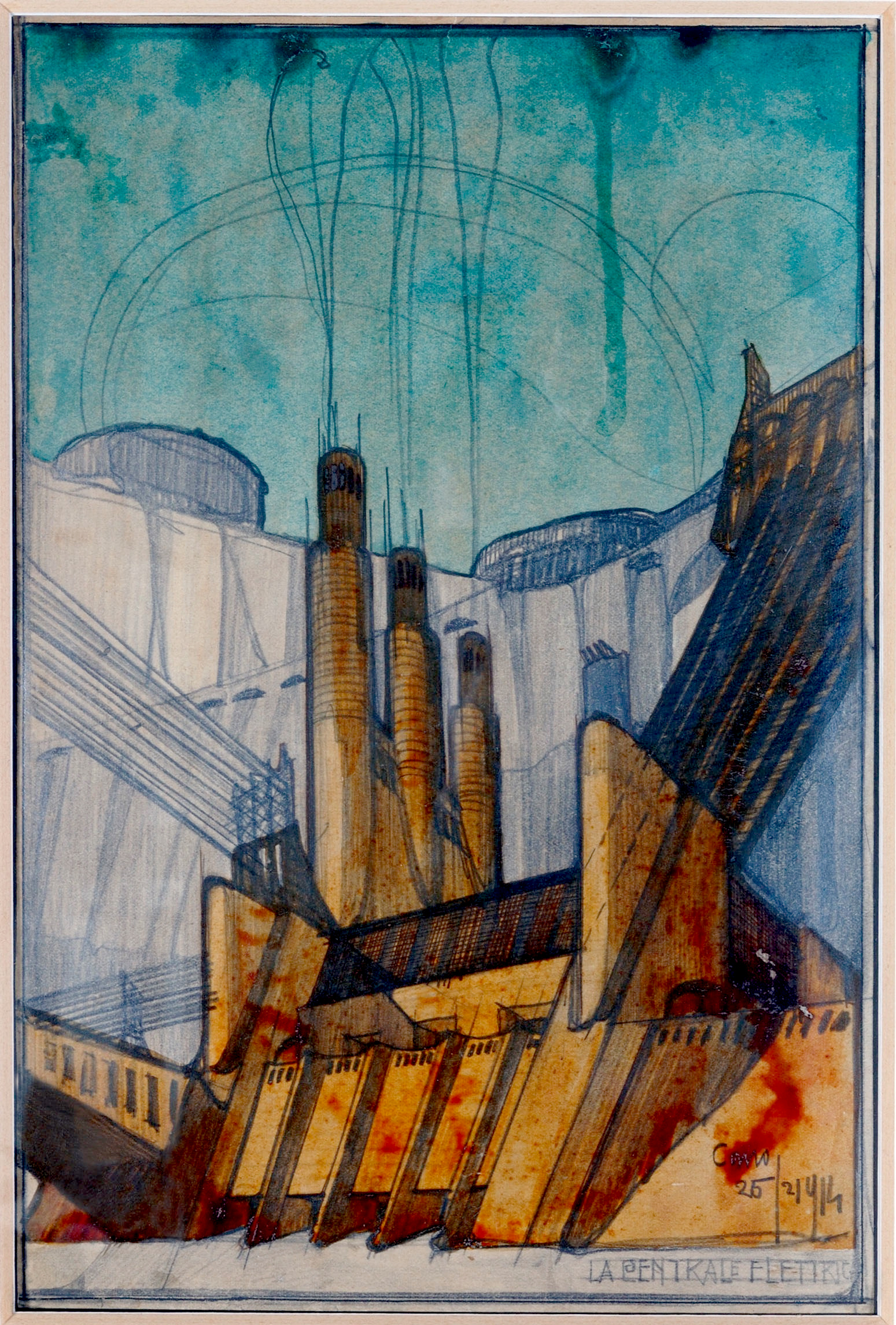
Power station (1914)

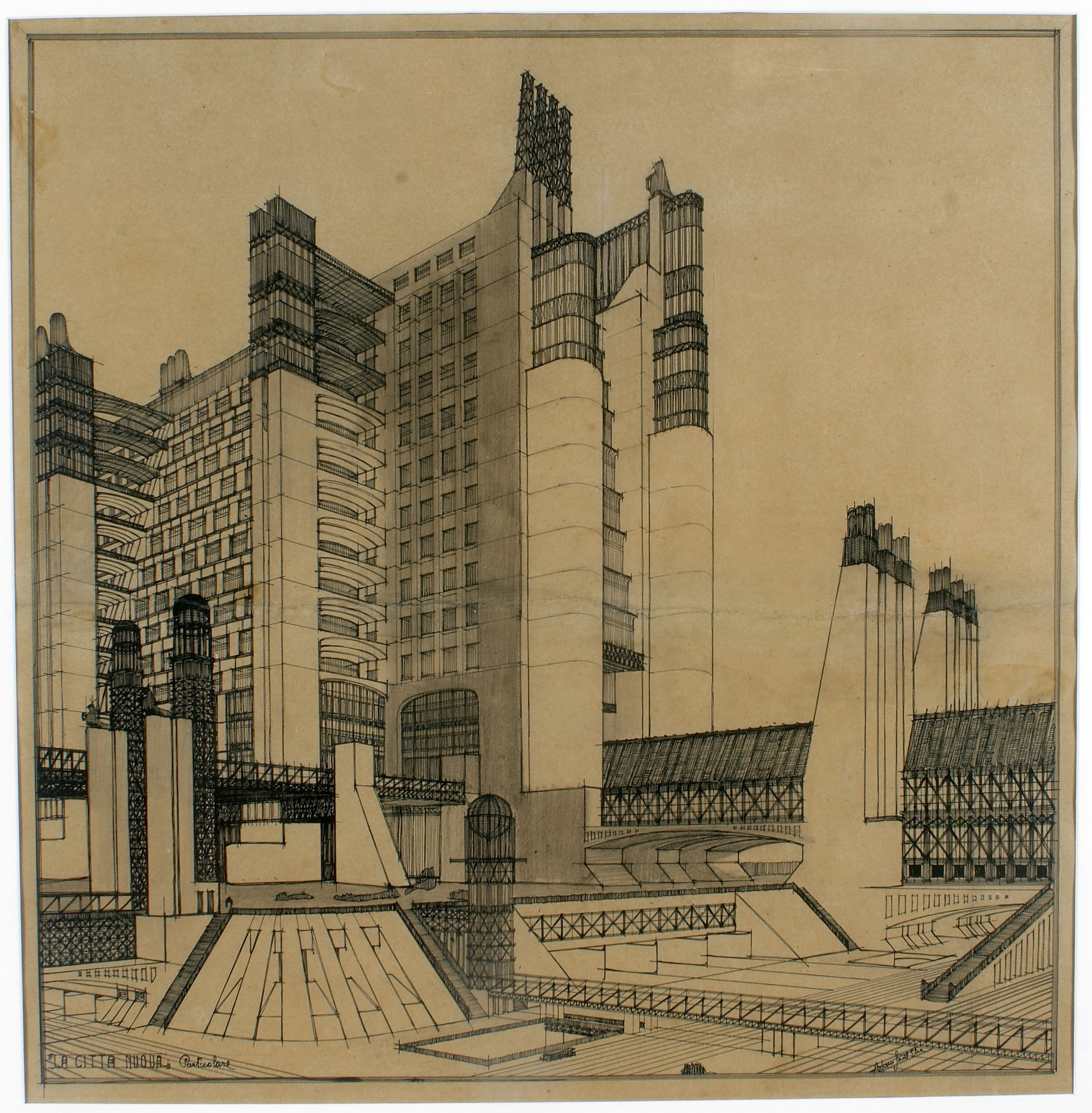
House with external elevators (1914)

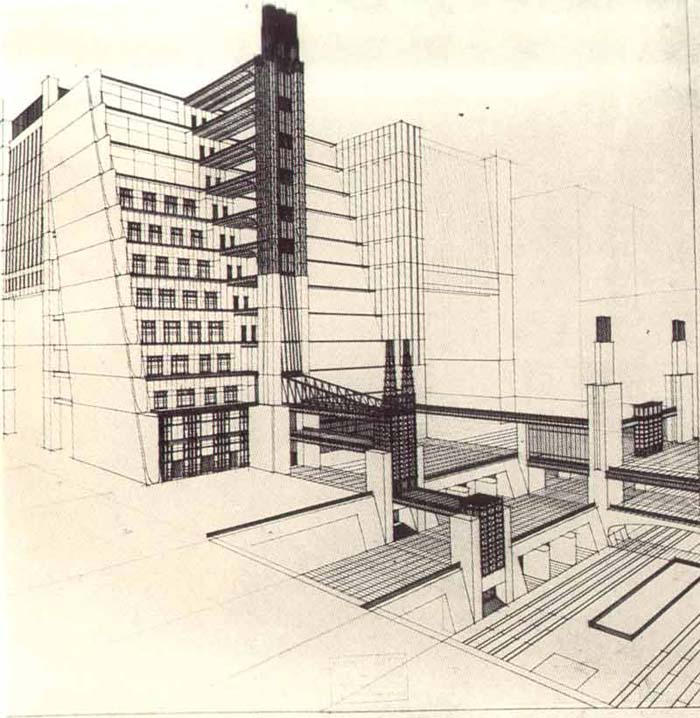
Drawing (1914)

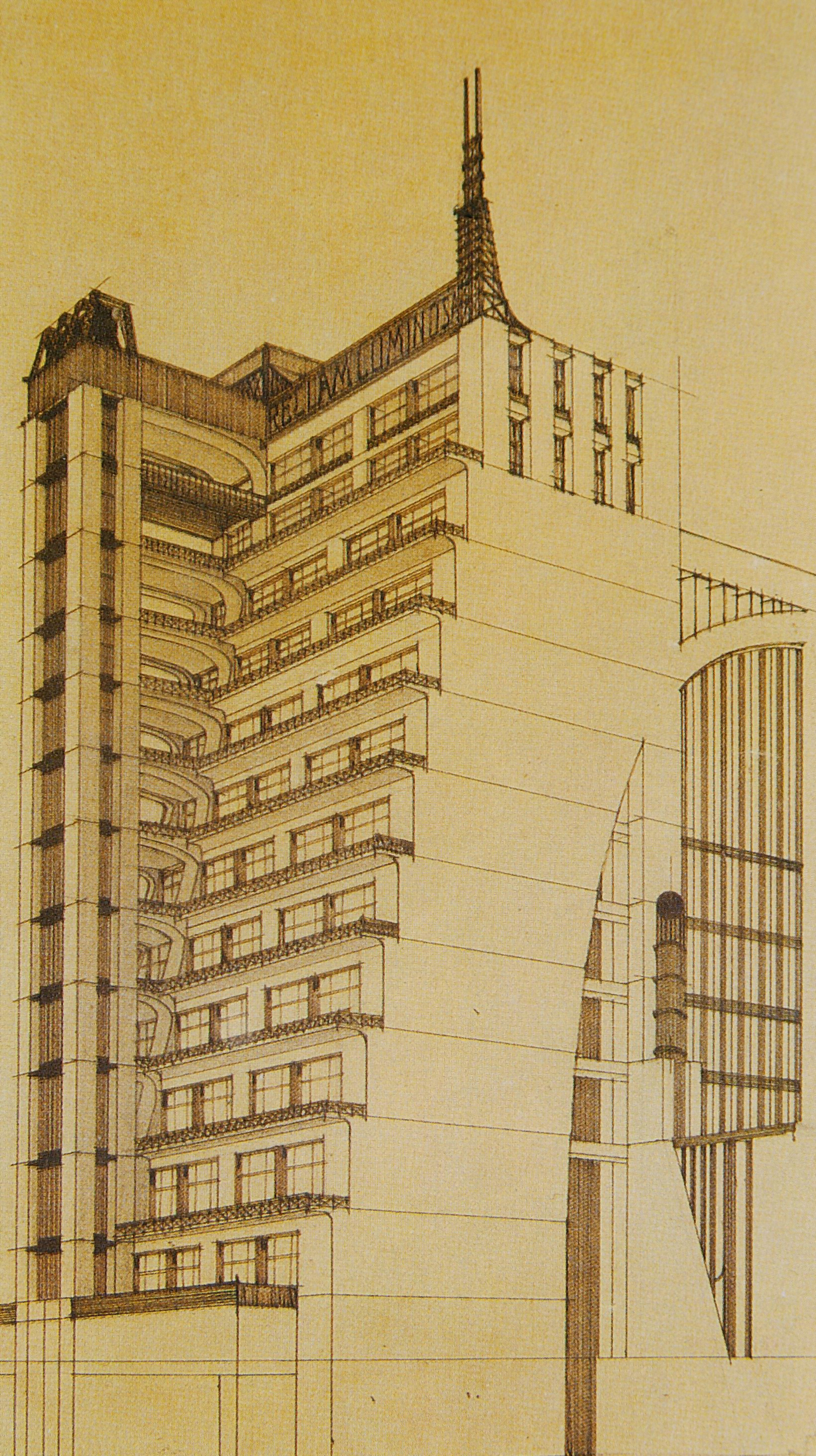
Drawing (1914)

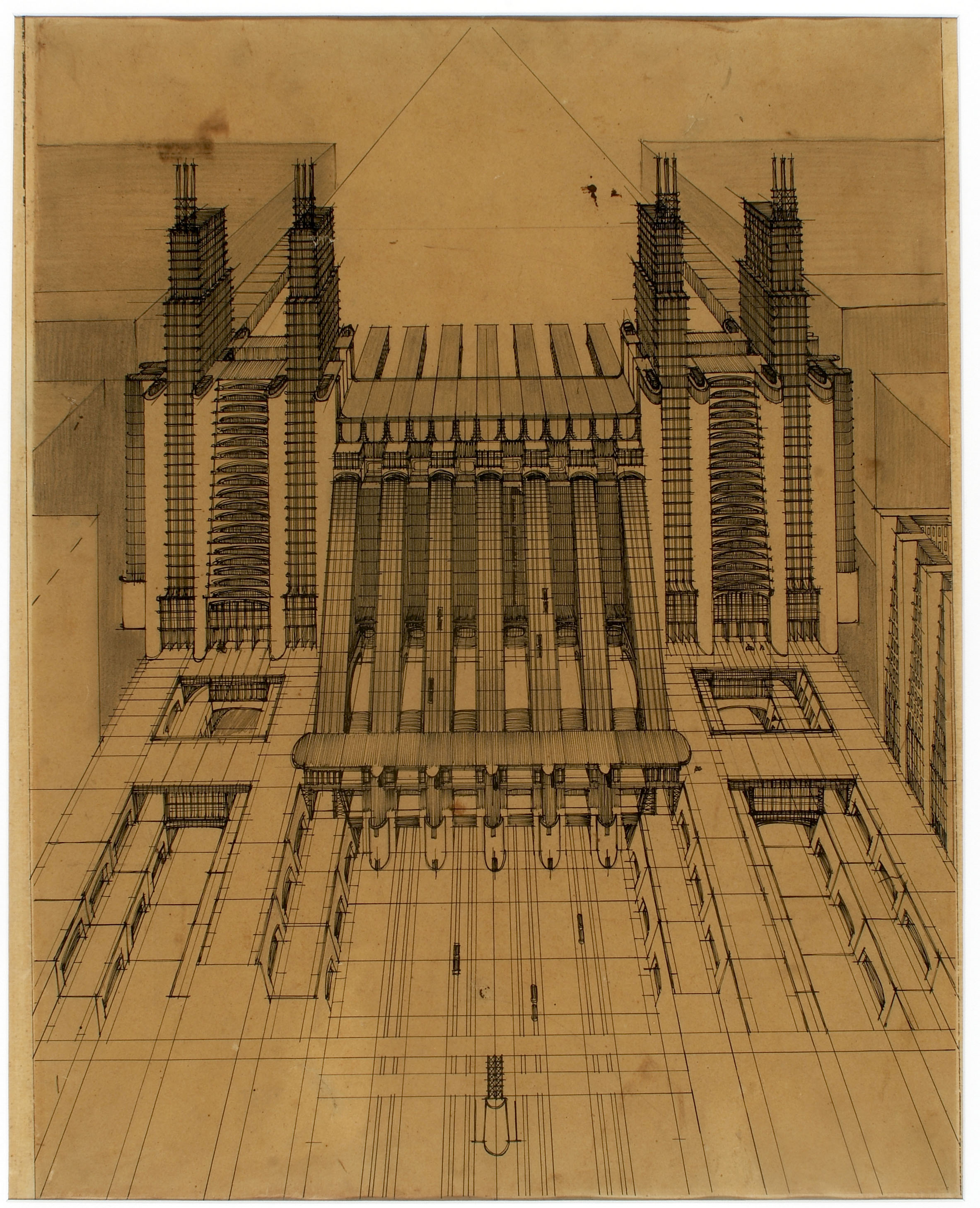
Perspective drawing from La Città Nuova, 1914

== See also ==
- Futurist architecture
