= Pinacoteca Civica di Palazzo Volpi, Como =

Coordinates: 45.8074°N 9.0833°E

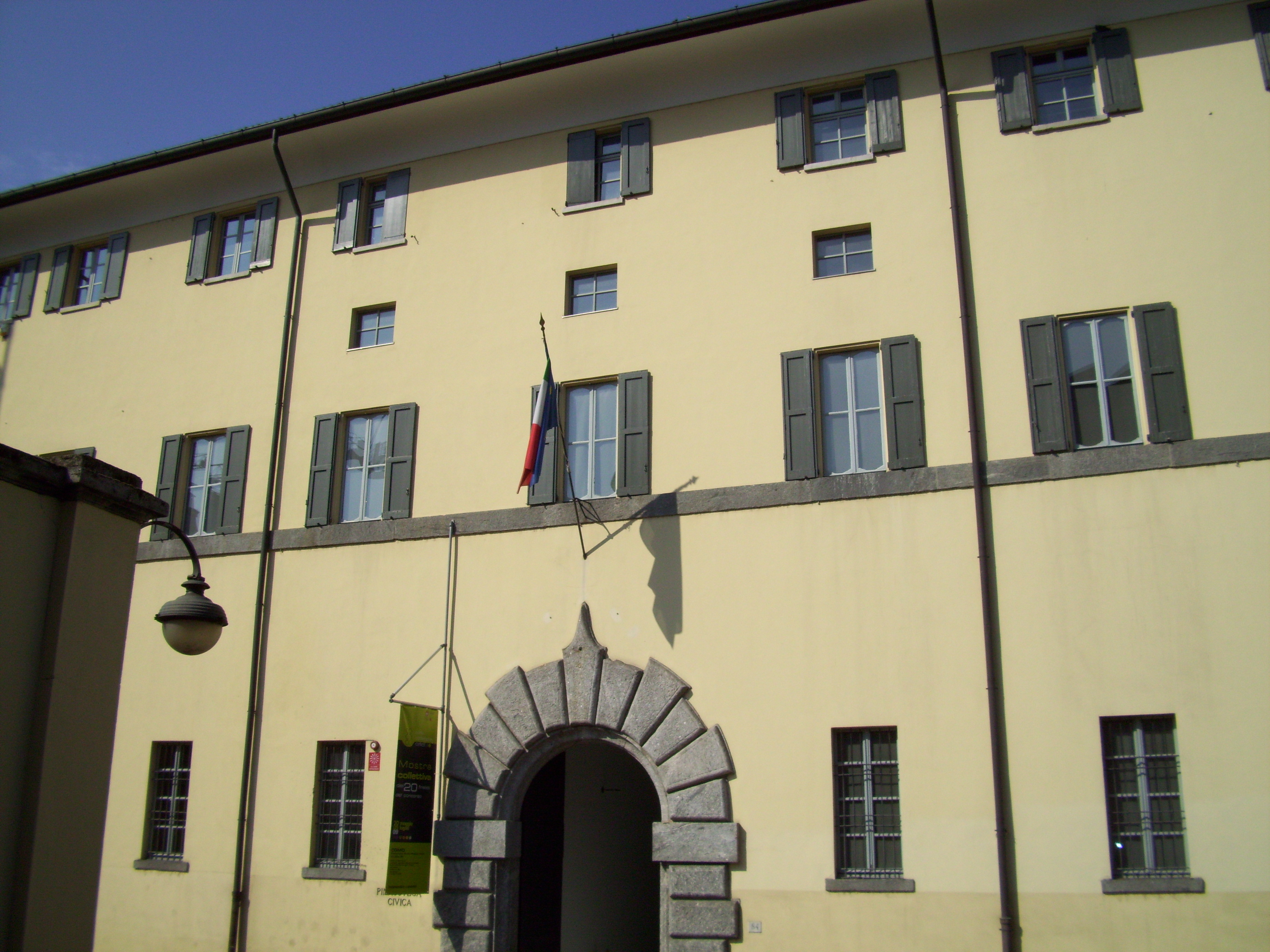
Entrance to Palazzo Volpi

The Pinacoteca Civica di Palazzo Volpi is the town art gallery on Via Diaz 84 in the town of Como, Lombardy, Italy. It is housed in the 17th-century Palazzo Volpi.

== History ==
The palace was erected from 1610 to 1630 by the Catholic nuncio and bishop of Novara, Ulpiano Volpi. He commissioned the sober Renaissance-style design from the architect Sergio Venturi. The building in the 20th century served as a courthouse until the 1970s.

Presently it is a civic art gallery. It houses collections whose core pre-19th-century works come from suppressed ecclesiastic institutions. For example, it houses Carolingian sculptures from the church of Sant'Abbondio as well as Romanesque and Gothic sculptures and frescoes. It contains a display of Paolo Giovio's portraits of illustrious men. It houses items from the Como Cathedral, including stained glass windows, sculptures, tapestries and wooden models. Among the paintings are:

- Virgin (Virgo advocata) attributed to Jacomart and Pere Joan Reixach
- Country Concert painted on 16th-century table by Ambrosius Benson
- Birth of the Virgin tapestry from the Como Cathedral
- Illuminated Libro d'Ore from Milan
- Nativity, panel by Giovanni Andrea de Magistris, father of Simone de Magistris
- Madonna with Child among Saints Cosma and Damiano (1515) fresco by the Master of the SS. Cosma and Damiano
- Fall of the Rebel Angels by Pier Francesco Mazzucchelli named "Morazzone", lunette from chapel in San Giovanni Pedemonte
- Triumph of the Archangel Michael by Carlo Francesco Nuvolone, lunette from chapel in San Giovanni Pedemonte
- Miracle of the Eucharist (1629) by Cristoforo Caresana, canvas from the chapel of San Pietro Martire of San Giovanni Pedemonte
- St Peter healing a Young Man (1629) by Giovanni Paolo Ghianda, canvas from the chapel of San Pietro Martire of San Giovanni Pedemonte
- Madonna Assunta with Saints Roch, Catherine, and Agnes by a young Giulio Cesare Procaccini
- St Helena and the True Cross, Birth of John the Baptist, and Event of Sinite Parvulos, canvases from the Palazzo Olginati
- Works by Giovanni Pietro Gnocchi
- Portrait of Vespasiano Gonzaga Colonna (1559) portrait of the prince of Sabbioneta in arms of a Habsburg official parade by Bernardino Campi
- Guardian Angel by Pietro Ligari
- Works in the style of Futurism by Antonio Sant'Elia
- Abstract art by Como Group
- Works by Ico Parisi
