= Cristofano dell'Altissimo =

Italian painter (c. 1525–1605)

Cristofano dell'Altissimo (c. 1525 – 1605) was an Italian painter in Florence. For duke Cosimo I de' Medici he copied in Como at least 280 of the portraits from the Collection of Paolo Giovio known as the Giovio Series (484 in total). Most of them can be seen at the Uffizi Gallery in Florence.

== Work ==
He was a pupil of Pontormo and Bronzino. In July 1552 he was sent to Como by Cosimo I de' Medici to copy the portraits of famous men in Paolo Giovio’s museum. By the end of May 1553, Cristofano had sent 24 finished portraits to Florence, followed by 26 more by September 1554 and another 25 by October 1556. The following month Cristofano received 100 scudi from Cosimo. By 1591 the works had been transferred to the corridors of the Uffizi, where they form part of the museum’s large collection of portraits. During his stay in Como, Cristofano travelled to Milan to execute two portraits of the Ippolita Gonzaga (1535–1563), the daughter of Ferrante Gonzaga, in competition with Bernardino Campi, who was declared the winner. One of the portraits went eventually to her father, Giuliano Groselino.

In November 1562 Cristofano was noted as treasurer of the Accademia delle Arti del Disegno in Florence, which received its official recognition in January 1563. On 18 January 1564 Vasari wrote to Angelo Riffoli, the ducal treasurer, requesting payment for ten portraits executed by Cristofano for Cosimo. On 5 April 1565 Vincenzo Borghini recommended Cristofano to Cosimo for employment in connection with the preparations for the marriage of Cosimo’s son Francesco (later Francesco I de' Medici, Grand Duke of Tuscany) to Joanna of Austria. On 22 February 1567 Cristofano enrolled in the Arte dei Medici e Speziali. Between 1587 and 1589 he sent another group of works to Florence from the Giovio museum. The following year he was back in Florence, and in 1596 his lawsuit against Donato Bandinelli, concerning a portrait and drawing depicting Francesco Ferrucci, was submitted to a tribunal of the Accademia.

=== Gallery ===
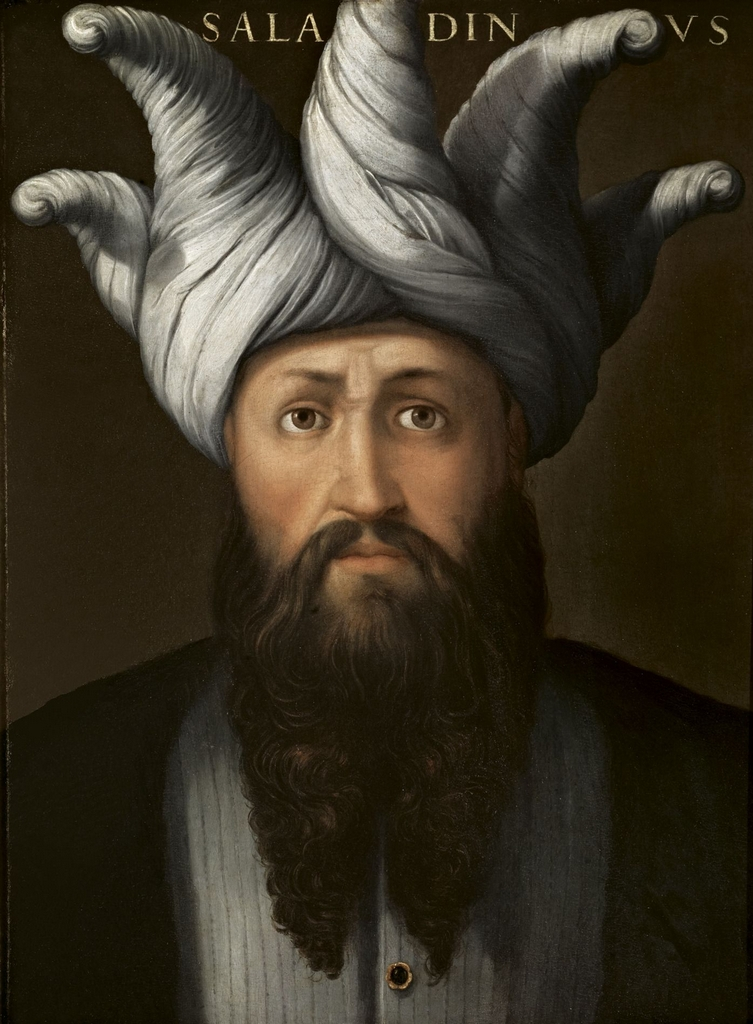
Portrait of Saladin (1137–1193)

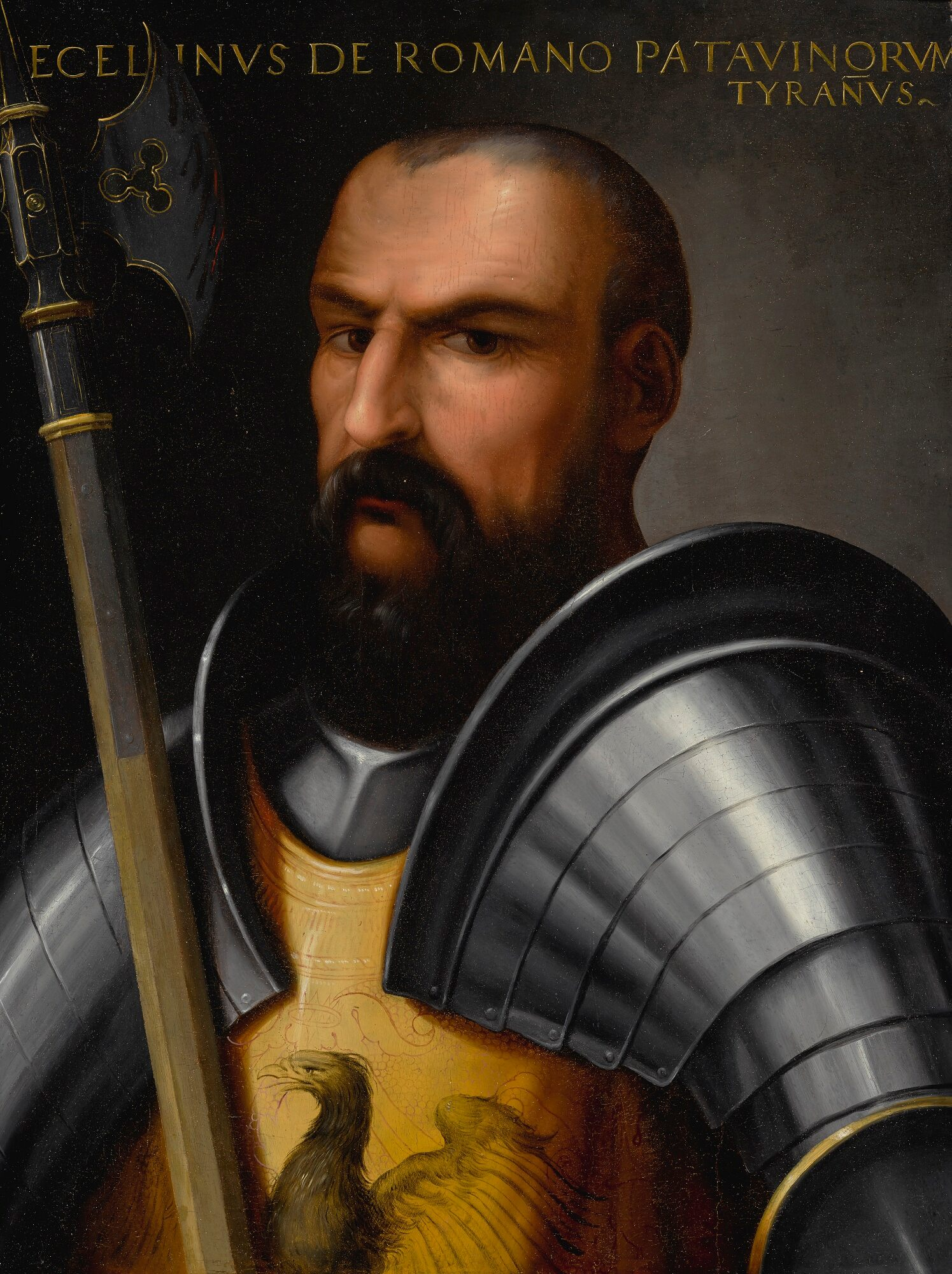
Portrait of Ezzelino III da Romano (1194–1259)

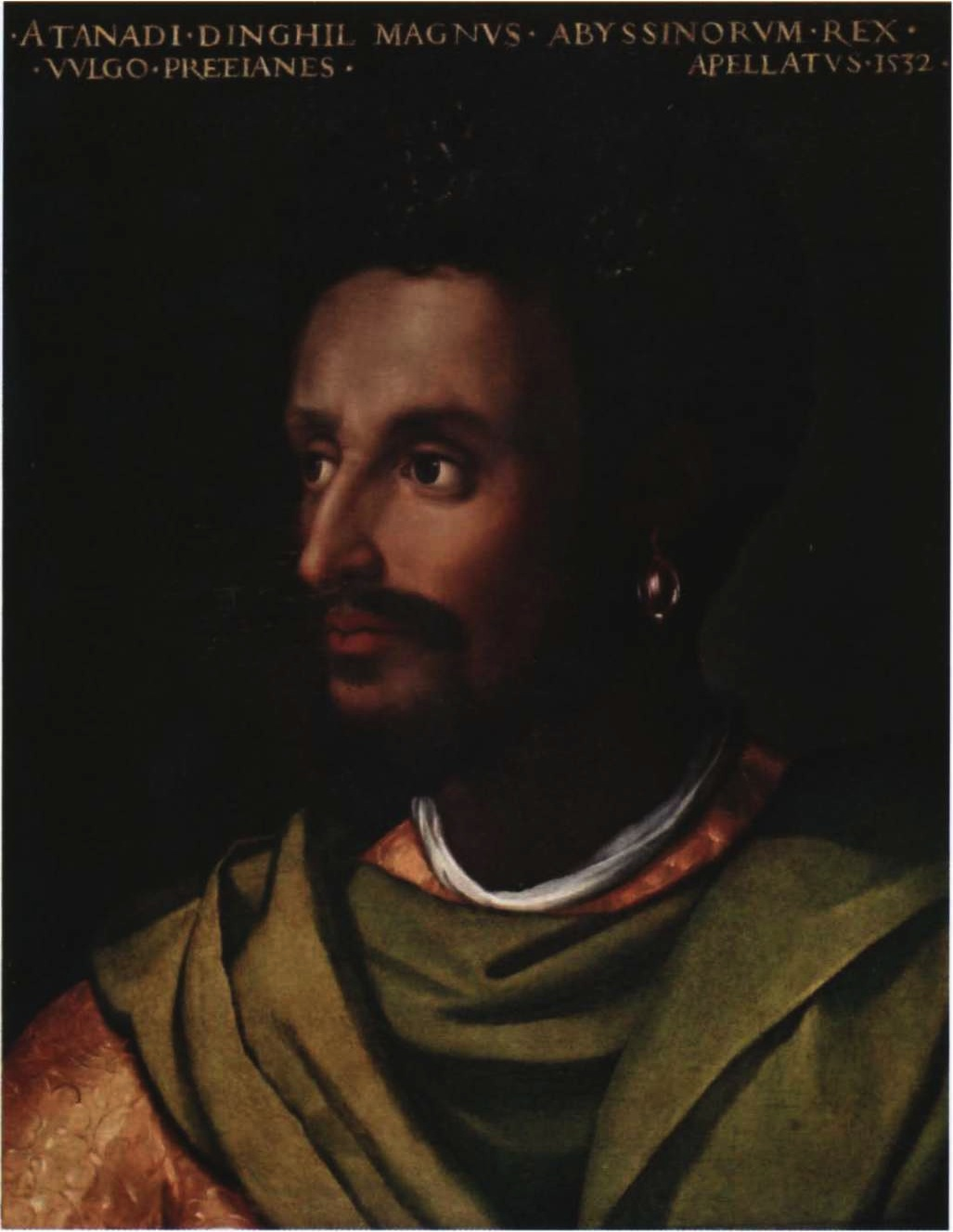
Portrait of Lebnä-Dengel (1496–1540)

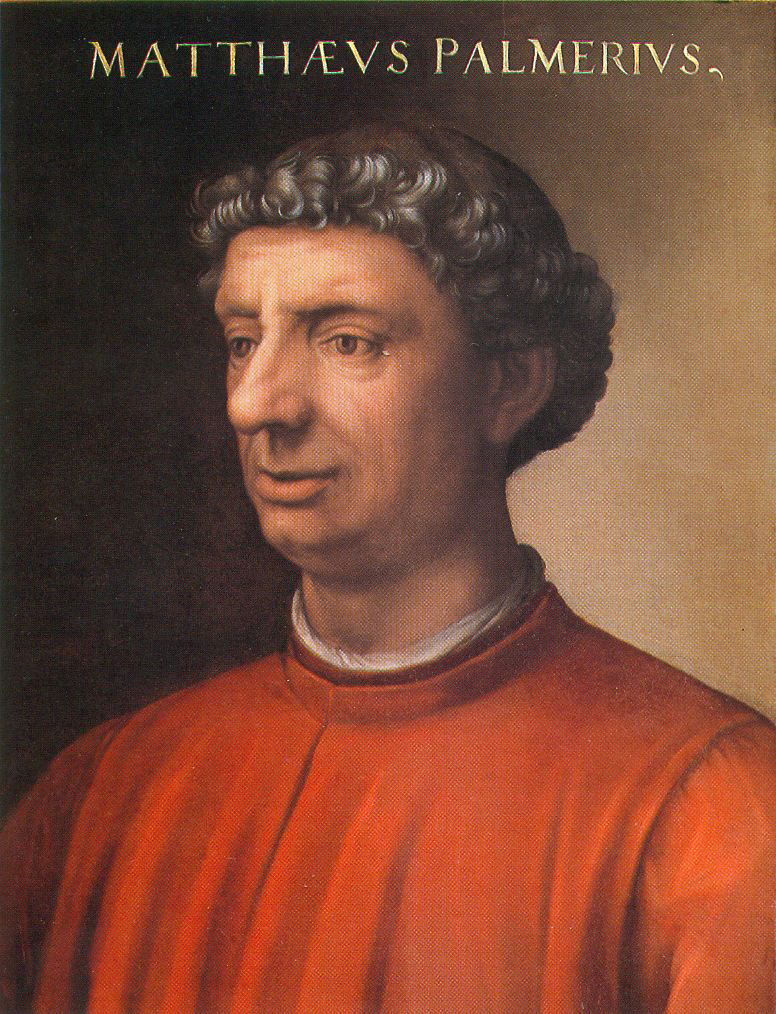
Portrait of Matteo Palmieri (1406–1475)

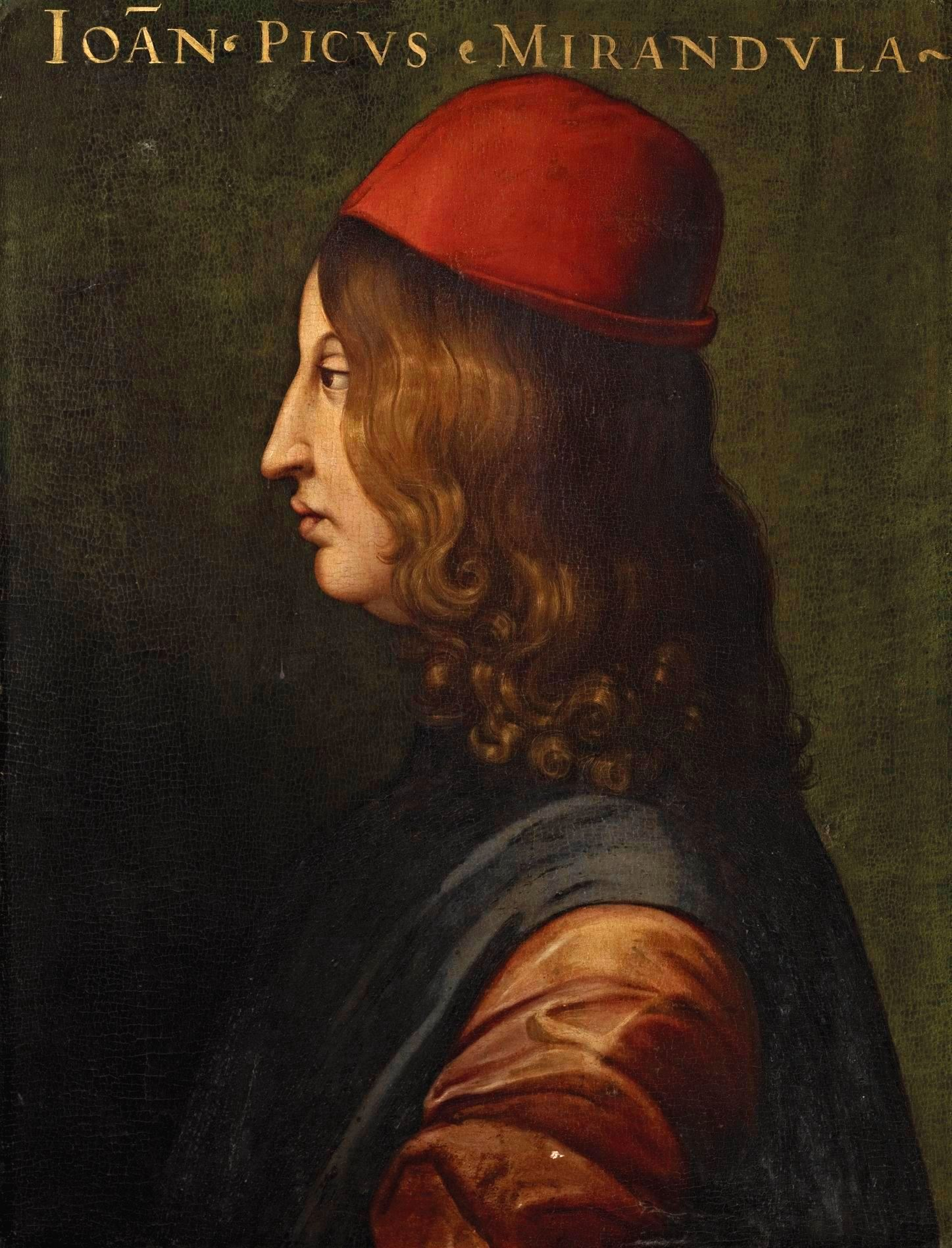
Portrait of Giovanni Pico della Mirandola (1463–1494)

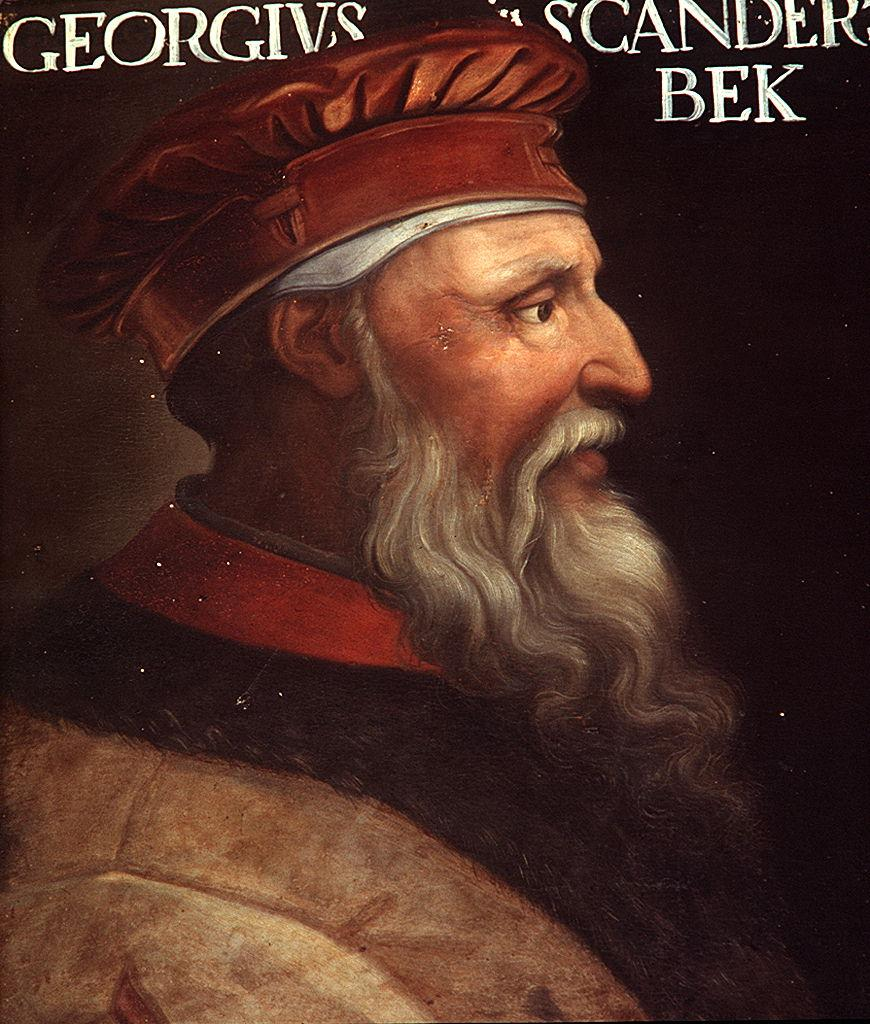
Portrait of Skanderbeg (1405–1468)

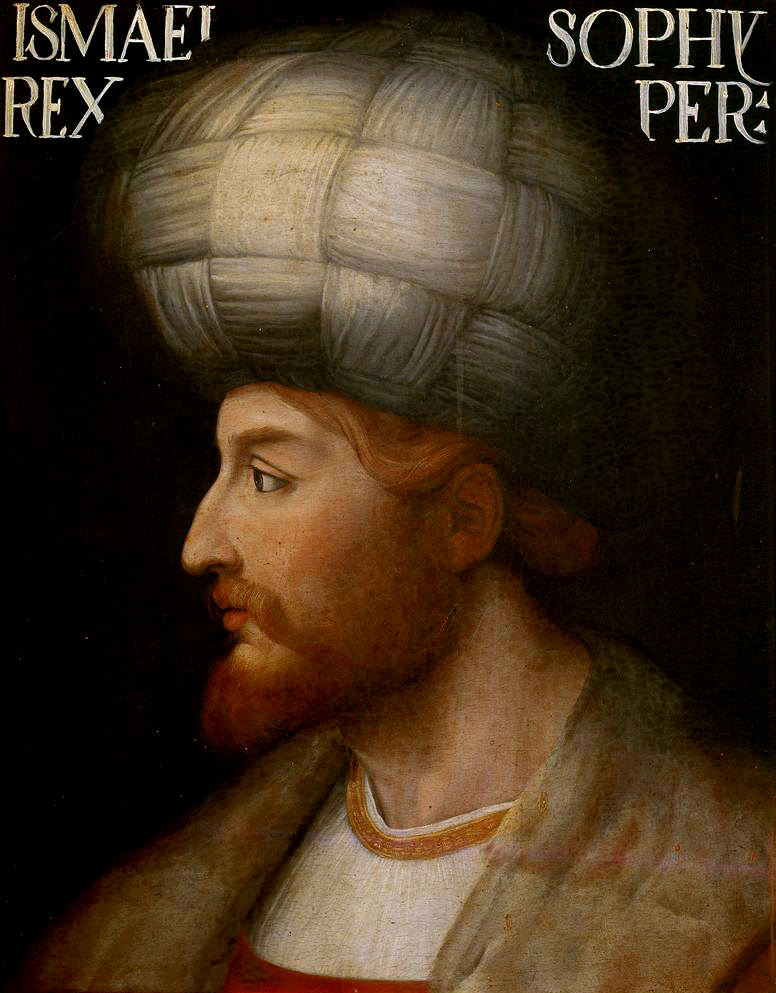
Portrait of Shah Ismail I Safavi (1487–1524)

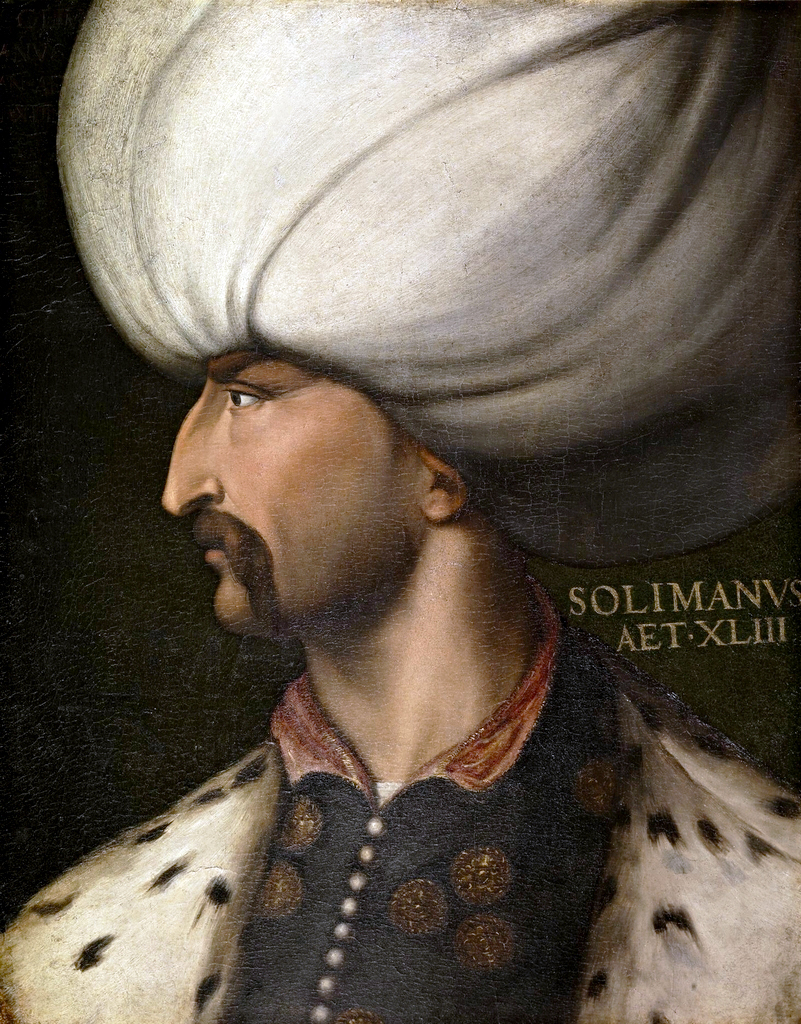
Portrait of Suleiman the Magnificent (1494–1566), after Titian

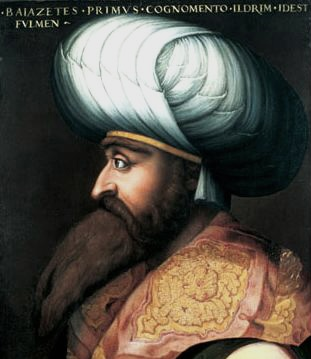
Portrait of Bayezid I (1360–1403)

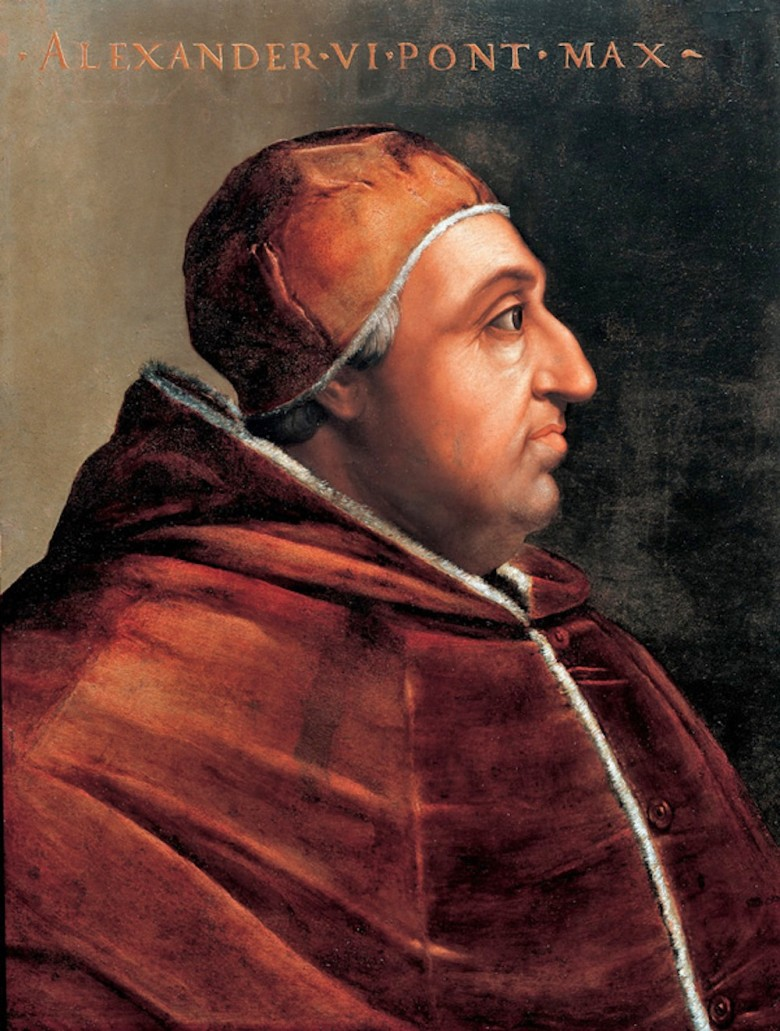
Portrait of Pope Alexander VI (1431–1503)

== Bibliography ==
- Aleci, Linda Kinger. "Images of Identity: Italian Portrait Collections of the Fifteenth and Sixteenth Centuries." "The Image of the Individual: Portraits in the Renaissance" Eds. Nicholas Mann and Luke Syson. London: British Museum Press, 1998. 67–79.
- Campbell, Lorne. Renaissance Portraits: European Portrait-Painting in the 14th, 15th and 16th Centuries. New Haven: Yale University Press, 1990.
- Fossi, Gloria. Uffizi Gallery: Art, History, Collections. Firenze: Firenze Musei, 2001.
- Giovio, Paolo. An Italian Portrait Gallery. Translated by Florence Alden Gragg. Boston: Chapman & Grimes, 1935.
- Haskell, Francis. History and its Images: Art and the Interpretation of the Past. Yale University Press. 1995. ISBN 0-300-05949-3, ISBN 978-0-300-05949-6
- Müntz, Eugène. "Le Musée de portraits de Paul Jove. Contributions pour servir à l’iconographie du moyen âge et de la renaissance," Mémoires de l'Institut nationale de France, Académie des inscriptions et belles-lettres, Vol. 36, no. 2, 1900. 249–343.
- Zimmermann, T. C. Price. Paolo Giovio: The Historian and the Crisis of Sixteenth-Century Italy. Princeton, NJ: Princeton University Press, 1995.
