= Heem =

Heem or variant thereof, may refer to:

== People ==
- Jan Heem (late 13th century - early 14th century), Flemish politician
- David Davidsz de Heem (1570–1632), Dutch painter
- Jan Davidsz. de Heem (1606–1684), Dutch painter, son of David Davidsz
- Jan Janszoon de Heem (1650–1695), Dutch painter, son of Jan Davidszoon
- Cornelis de Heem (1631–1695), Dutch painter, son of Jan Davidszoon
- David Cornelisz de Heem (1663–1701), Dutch painter, son of Cornelis
- Bryce Heem (born 1989), New Zealand rugby union footballer

== Places ==
- Embaba Airport (ICAO airport code: HEEM), a closed airport in Giza, Egypt
- -heem (-hiem), the Frisian place-suffix, see Artificial dwelling hill

== Other ==
- Higher Education European Masters (HEEM), an Erasmus Mundus program

== See also ==
- Heme or Haem, the blood cofactor
- Himanshu Kumar Suri or Heems (born 1985), American rapper
