= Andries de Coninck =

Flemish art dealer

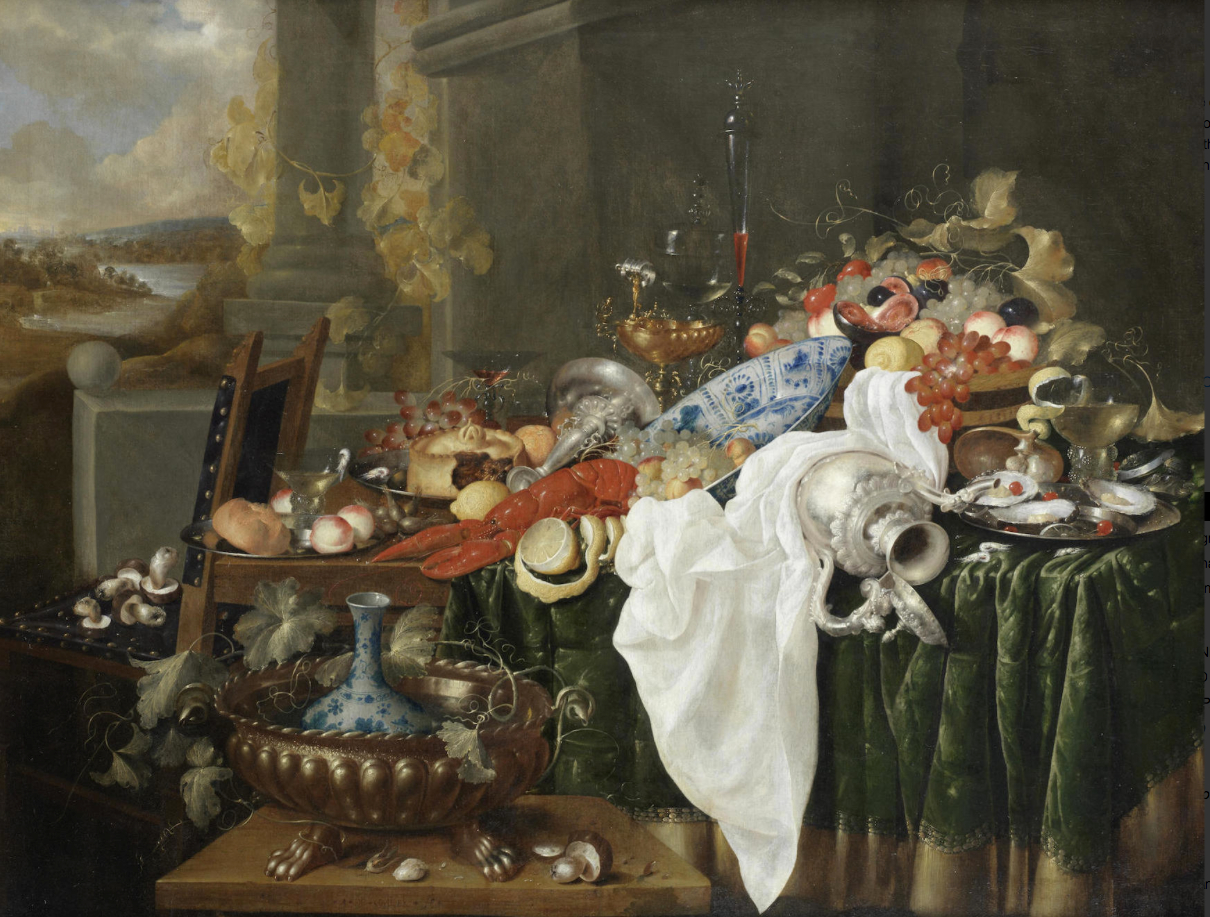
Still life of a pie on a silver dish

Andries de Coninck or Andries de Koninck (Note: Variant name spellings: Andries de Coning, Andries de Koning, Andries De Coninck) (c. 1615 – 30 March 1659) was a Flemish art dealer and still life painter active in Antwerp. He is known for his pronkstillevens, the still lifes that were popular in Flanders and the Dutch Republic from the 1640s.

== Life ==
Little is known about the life of Andries de Coninck. He was likely born in Antwerp. He was registered in the guild year 1643–1644 at the Antwerp Guild of Saint Luke as an apprentice of Jan Thomas van Ieperen, a history and portrait painter. The words 'schilder en handelaar' (painter and dealer) were added behind his name in the register. In 1645 de Coninck was registered as a master in the Antwerp Guild in the capacity of an art dealer. He was listed in the 1658/59 guild records as koopman (art dealer). It is possible that the artist abandoned his painting career in favour of his trading business. His wife Christina Benedetti was probably a sister of the still life painter Andries Benedetti whose work shows similarities with de Coninck's work. The couple's son Andries was later active as a lace dealer and broker in Cádiz, Spain.

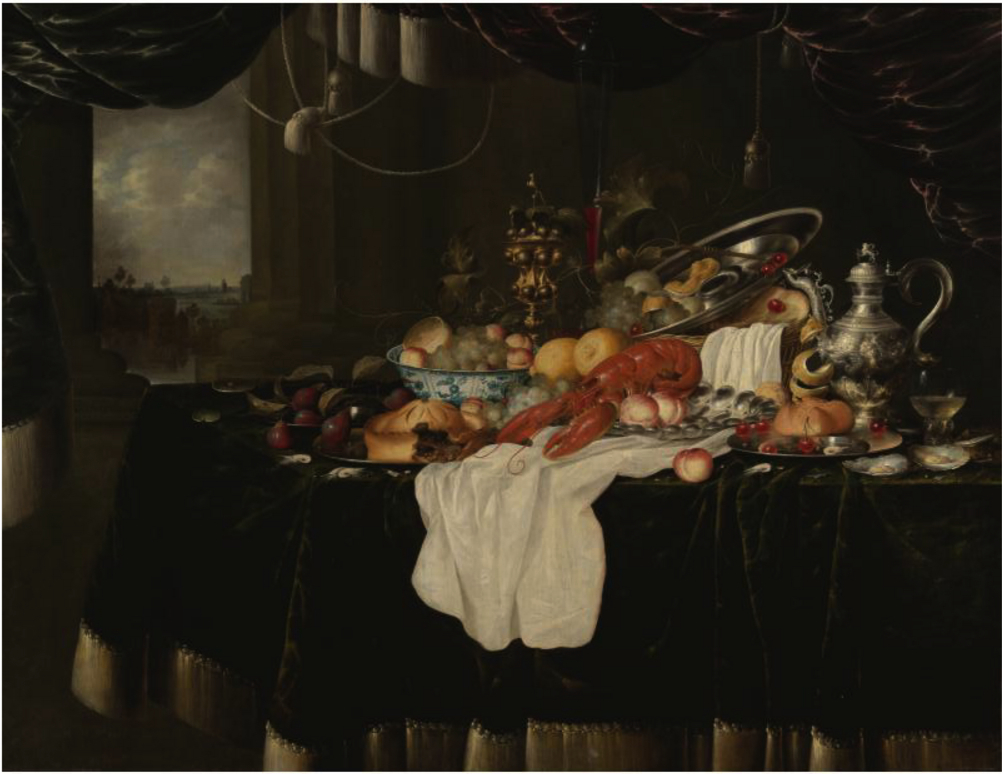
Elaborate still life with a lobster, sweetmeat pie, oysters, fruit, and a blue and white wanli bowl

De Conick died on 30 March 1659 when he was probably not even 35 years old. That likely explains why so few of his paintings have been reported. Another reason could be that he ceased painting to focus solely on his art dealer business.

== Work ==
Andries de Coninck was a still life specialist who is known for his pronkstillevens, the sumptuous still lifes that were popular in Flanders and the Dutch Republic from the 1640s. Only five works are ascribed to him. Four of these are signed by the artist, two with the spelling of his last name as 'de Coninck' and two with the spelling 'de Koninck'. All his known works have broadly the same composition with an elaborate pronk still life displayed on a draped table before an open window on the left opening out to a landscape.

His work was indebted to de work of Jan Davidszoon de Heem, a prominent Dutch still life painter who was active in Antwerp from the mid-1630s. His brother-in-law Andries Benedetti also painted large still lifes, which followed the innovations of de Heem. As a result, it is sometimes difficult to distinguish compositions by de Coninck from work by Benedetti.

The genre of the pronk still lifes practised by de Coninck had been developed in Antwerp in the 1630s. It was particularly fashionable during the 1640s and 1650s in both Flanders and in Holland. Particularly in Antwerp, Amsterdam and Utrecht various artists created works in this genre. These works typically depict foods and fruits together with a number of precious objects: Venetian glassware, Chinese Wan–li porcelain, silver plates and gilt goblets. The intention of the paintings appears to be to express the status of their owners. At the same time they are also believed to carry a moral lesson, i.e. they can be read as vanitas paintings, which warn about the fleetingness of life and the emptiness of wealth and earthly possessions.
