= Jan Thomas van Ieperen =

Flemish painter (1617–1673)

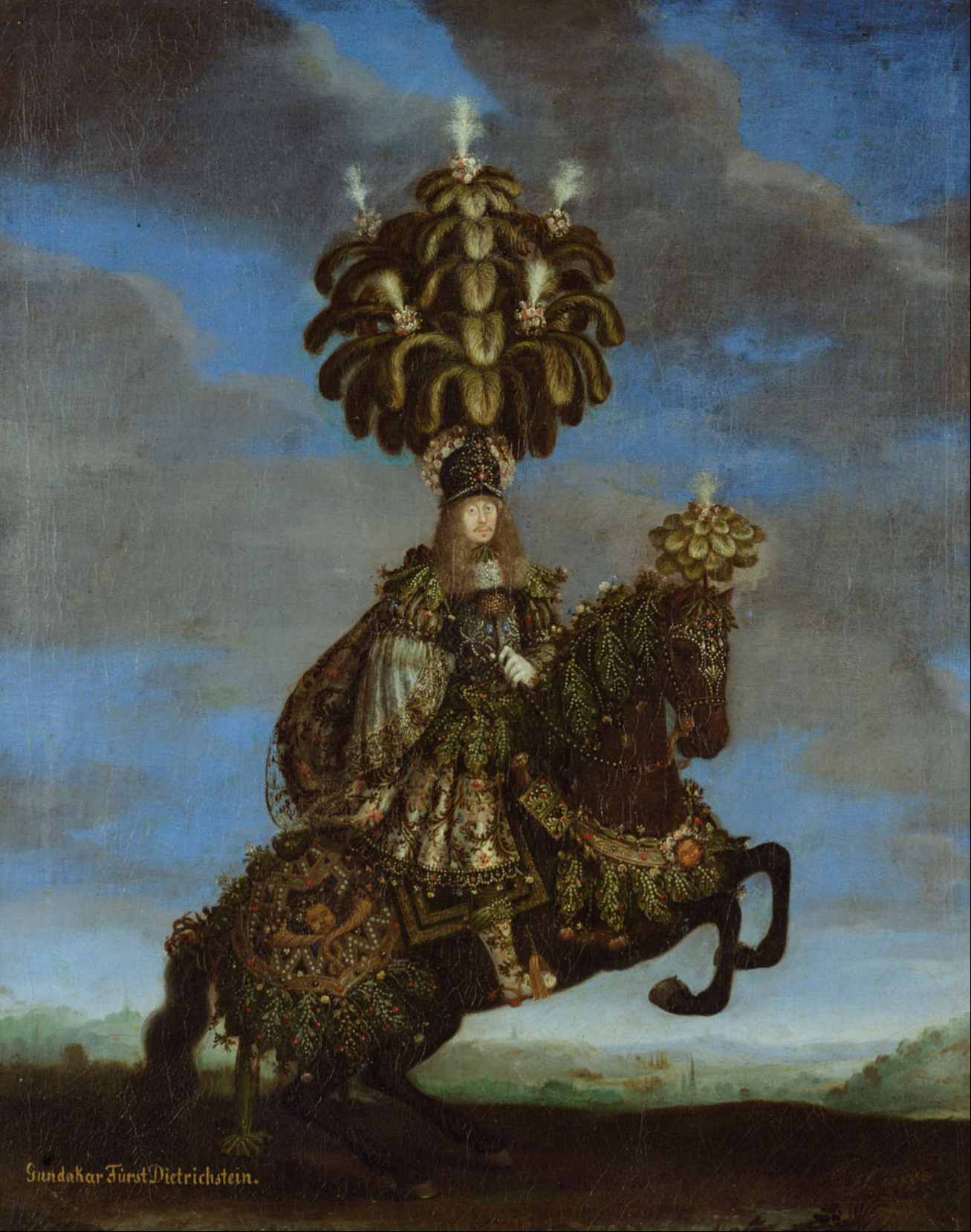
Gundakar, Prince of Dietrichstein

Jan Thomas or Jan Thomas van Ieperen (5 February 1617 – 6 September 1673) was a Flemish Baroque painter, draughtsman and printmaker. He was first active in Antwerp where he worked in the workshop of Rubens. He later became court painter at the Habsburg court in Vienna. He is known for his portraits of the rulers of Austria as well as for his pastoral, mythological and religious scenes.

== Life ==
Jan Thomas was born in Ypres, Flanders in Spanish Netherlands. Ypres is called Ieper and Ieperen in Flemish. The addition 'van Ieperen', which means 'from Ypres' was added to his name to indicate this.

Little is known about the artist's training. The 17th century Flemish biographer Cornelis de Bie wrote in his Het Gulden Cabinet that Jan Thomas was a pupil of Peter Paul Rubens. There is evidence that he spent time in Rubens' workshop at the end of Rubens' life or shortly thereafter. There are stylistic grounds to consider Thomas as a pupil of Rubens as he was familiar with Rubens' late works and translated some of them to smaller scale paintings. Modern scholarship tends to regard Jan Thomas as one of the many collaborators in Rubens' workshop who assisted with large commissions such as the decorations for the Torre de la Parada, the hunting lodge of the Spanish king (1636–1638). It is possible that upon Rubens' death Thomas was the 'primer official' of Rubens' workshop, i.e. the chief assistant in charge of executing paintings after the designs of the master.

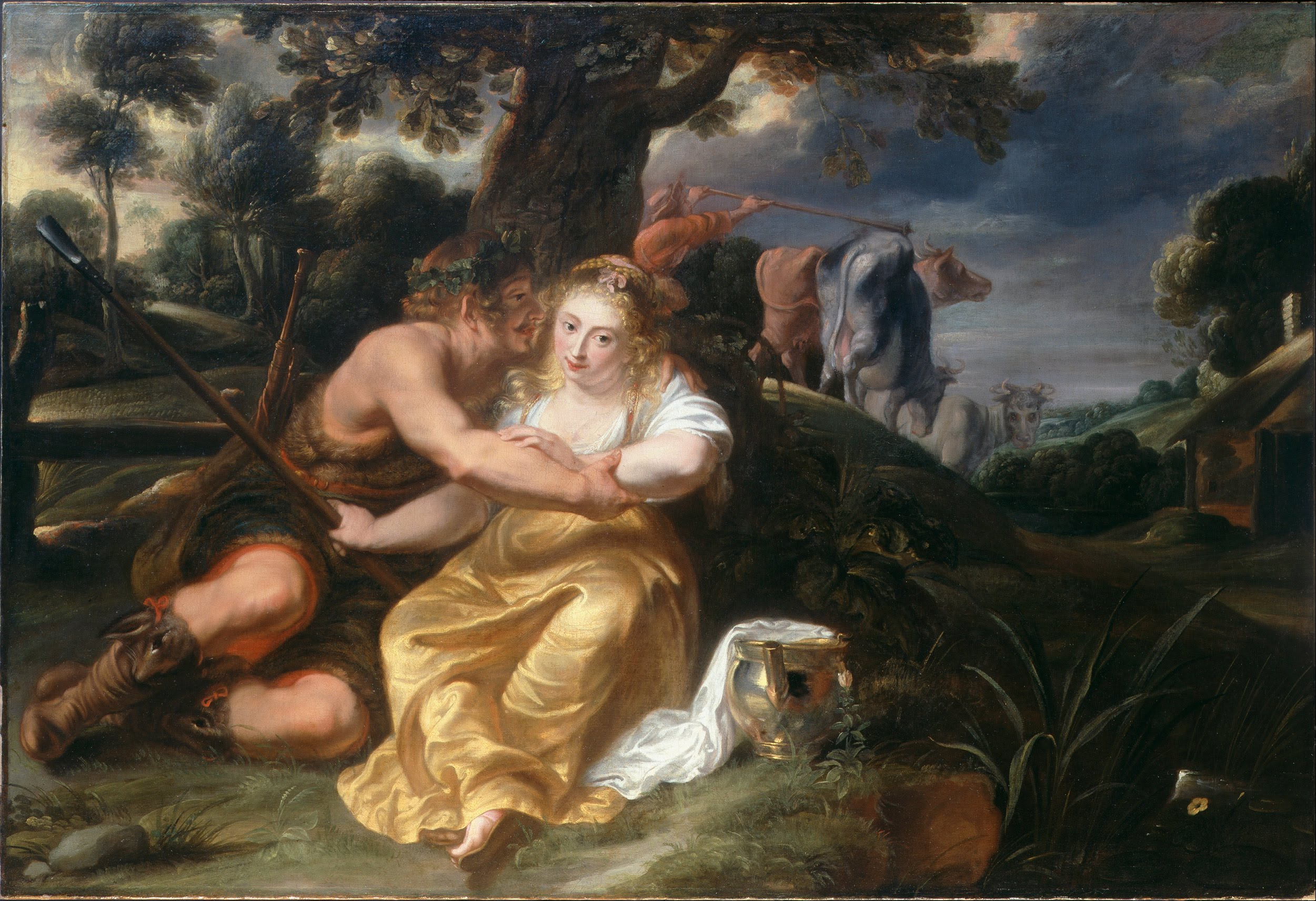
Shepherd and shepherdess

Jan Thomas became a master in the Antwerp Guild of Saint Luke in 1639/1640. Two years later he acquired Antwerp citizenship. In 1641/1642 he took Andris Lamberechts on as an apprentice. The next year Andries de Coninck and Jacob Sons joined his workshop as pupils. In 1642 he married Maria Cnobbaert, daughter of the Antwerp book dealer Joannes Cnobbaert. In 1652 Jan Thomas' third child was baptized in the St. James' Church in Antwerp, which is evidence that he was then still living in that city.

It is believed that Jan Thomas left Antwerp in 1654 to work as a painter for the bishop of Mainz Johann Philipp von Schönborn one of the important courts at that time. Jan Baptist de Ruel was his pupil during his stay in this city. Around 1658 he was in Frankfurt at the time of the coronation of Leopold I as emperor of the Holy Roman Empire and painted a (now lost) portrait of the emperor. In that period he also received commissions from the Archduke Leopold Wilhelm of Austria. From the latter part of the 1650s Jan Thomas certainly lived with his family in Vienna. He is documented in Vienna when a child of his was baptized there on 8 December 1663. He is recorded living in the Kärtnerstrasse in 1667. In Vienna he received commissions from the imperial court and painted the portraits of Leopold I and his wife Margaret Theresa in theater costume. These portraits were made at the occasion of the celebrations surrounding the marriage of the imperial couple in 1666.

Jan Thomas also received commissions from the higher clergy and the aristocracy, such as the House of Zrinski or Zrínyi. He painted a portrait of the general and poet Miklós Zrínyi a few years before Zrínyi's death in 1664.

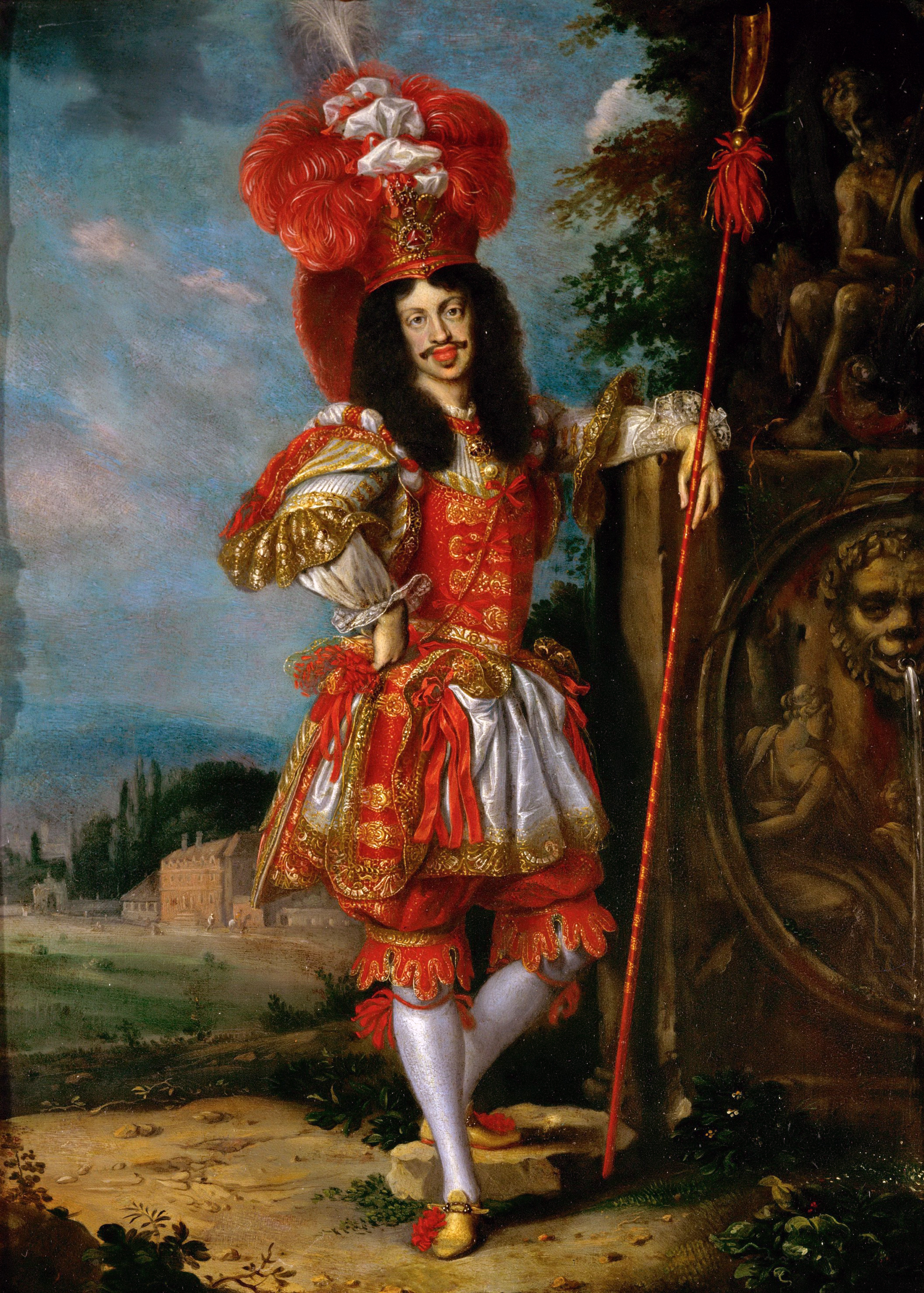
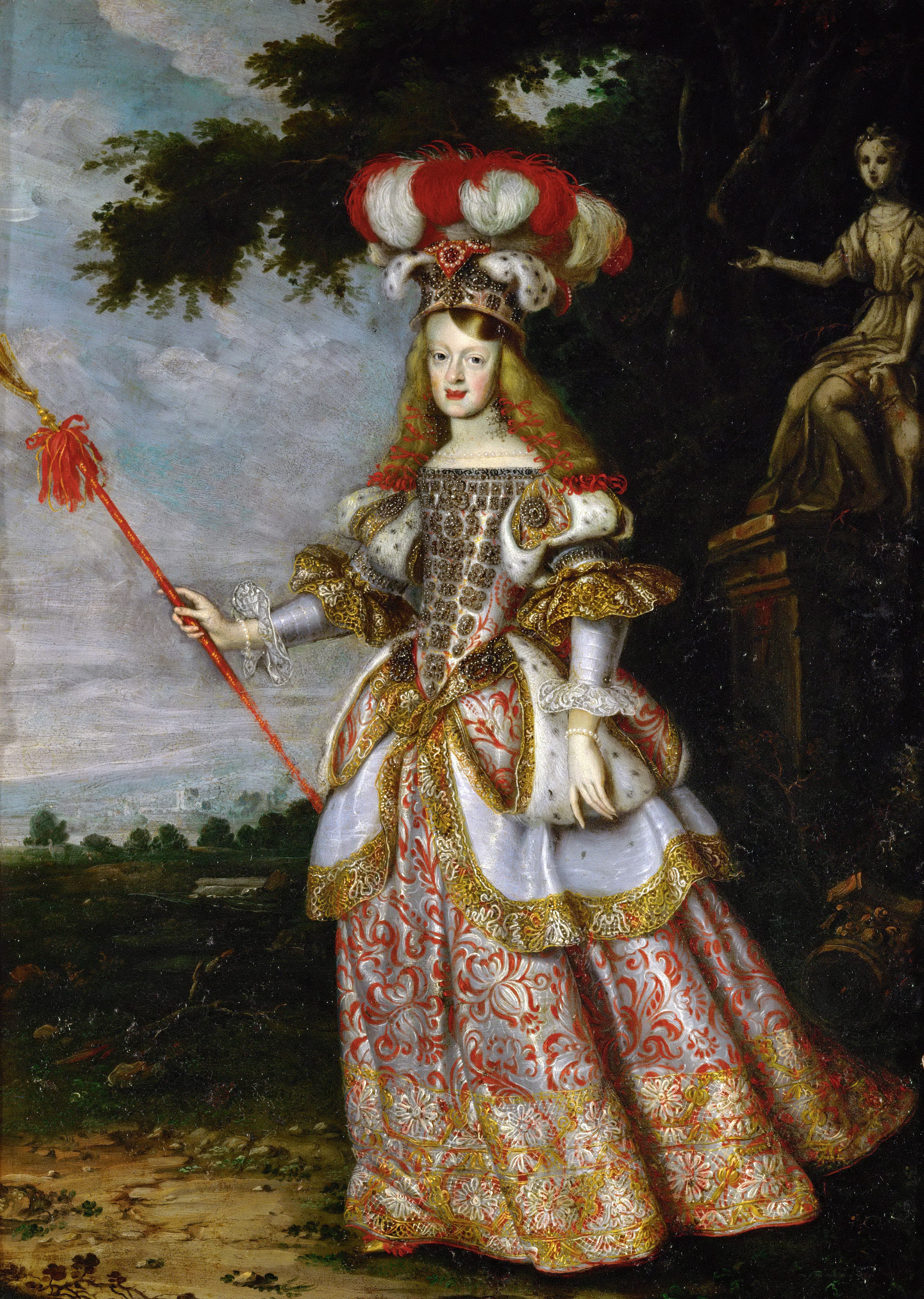
(left) Leopold I as Acis in the play 'La Galatea'; (right) Infanta Margaret Theresa, Empress, in theater dress

He died from a stroke in Vienna on 6 September 1673.

== Work ==
In addition to large religious history paintings, Jan Thomas painted landscapes with mythological or pastoral figures and portraits. He made a large number of portraits of Leopold William and Emperor Leopold I and other members of the royal and aristocratic families in the Habsburg territories.

His style shows a close relationship to that of Rubens, in particular that of Rubens' later work which was sent directly to Spain. This is evidence that he likely worked in Rubens' workshop at the end of the master's life and/or just after his death. Like his contemporary Frans Wouters, many of his works translate the monumental Baroque style of Peter Paul Rubens into the small context of cabinet paintings. This is particularly obvious in his biblical paintings in which he regularly cites from Rubens' works. In his small-scale mythological scenes his style is more reminiscent of the late Mannerist style of Frans Francken the Younger.

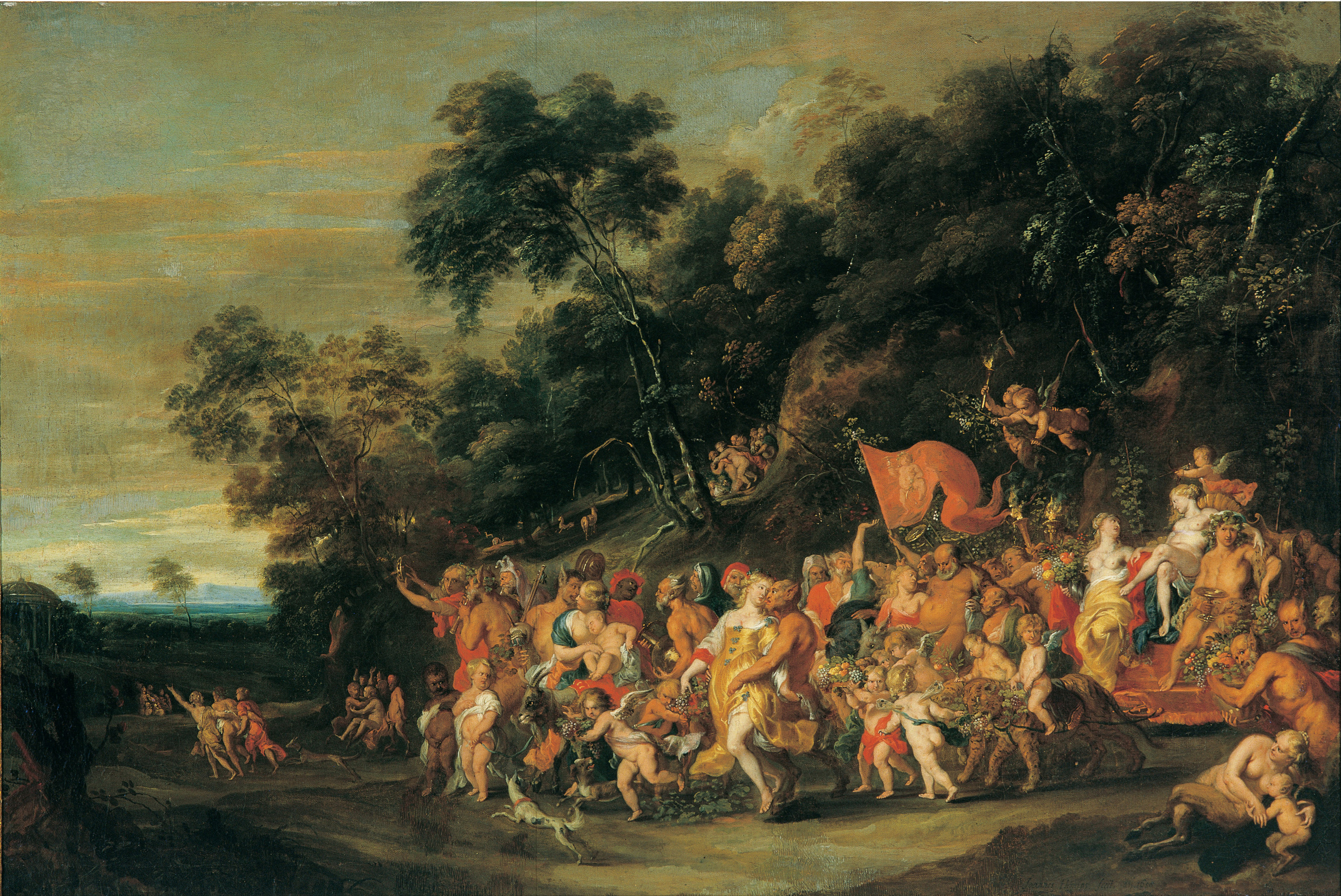
The triumph of Bacchus

His life-size portraits, which he already made during his stay in Vienna, are consistent with the elegant and, at the same time, decorative portrait style created by Flemish artists working in Vienna in the second half of the 17th century. An example is the Leopold I as Acis in the play 'La Galatea' (1668, Kunsthistorisches Museum).

Around 1658 Jan Thomas began to work in the new medium of the mezzotint. One of these works in mezzotint is a portrait of Titian from 1661, which was dedicated to Empress Eleonora, widow of the father of Leopold I, Emperor Ferdinand III. Besides engravings in mezzotint Jan Thomas also worked as an etcher and engraver. He made engravings of his own compositions as well as of the works of other artists such as Rubens, Anthony van Dyck, Gerard Dou and Giovanni Ambrogio Figino. In his graphic work he also made genre and allegorical works as in the Woman with the portrait of a man in her hand (Rijksmuseum), which was published by Frans van den Wyngaerde. It shows a sitting woman with an older woman behind her in a confined area. The younger woman holds the portrait of a man in her one hand and an arrow in her other. On the dressing table in front of her are placed a ring, a comb and scissors. This may be a pure genre scene or a vanitas allegory reminding the viewer of the temporary nature of all humanly endeavors.
