= Theodoor Aenvanck =

Flemish painter

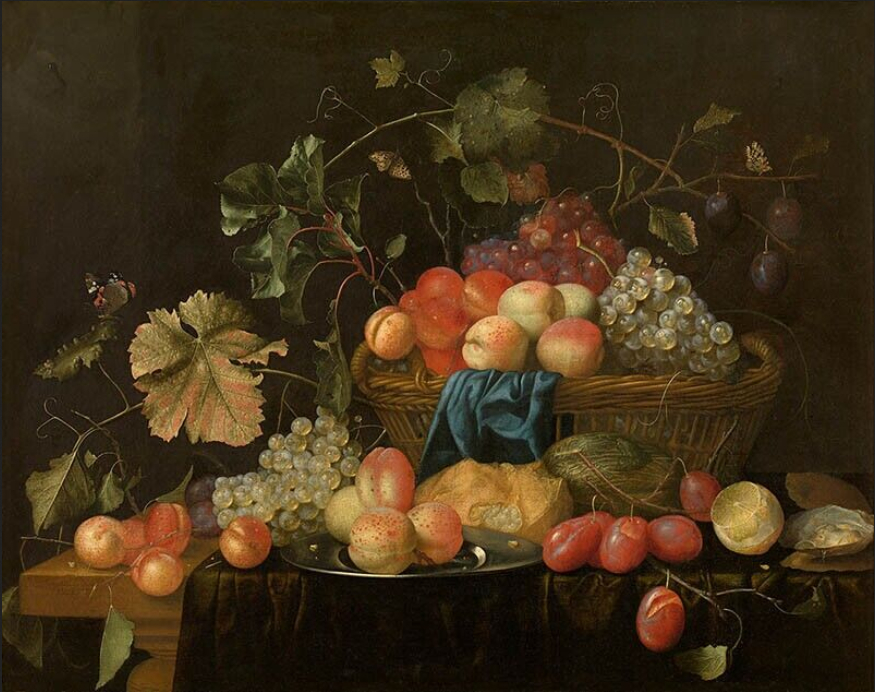
Fruit, 1659

Theodoor Aenvanck or Theodor Aenvanck (1633 – after 19 April 1690) was a Flemish painter. He is known for his still lifes of flowers, fruit and seafood.

== Life ==
Theodoor Aenvanck was born in Antwerp where he was baptized on 30 November 1633. He was a pupil of the prominent Dutch still life painter Jan Davidszoon de Heem who resided in Antwerp for a long time. He registered as a pupil of the Antwerp Guild of St. Luke in 1647 and in 1669 he became a master of the Guild. This suggests he may have spent a significant amount of time abroad.

He is mentioned in Antwerp notarial documents. On 3 August 1678, testimony is given to notary J. van Paesschen at Aenvanck's request about an argument with captain Sinterleir during the grand procession. On 26 January 1685, he became guardian of Abraham Aenvanck.

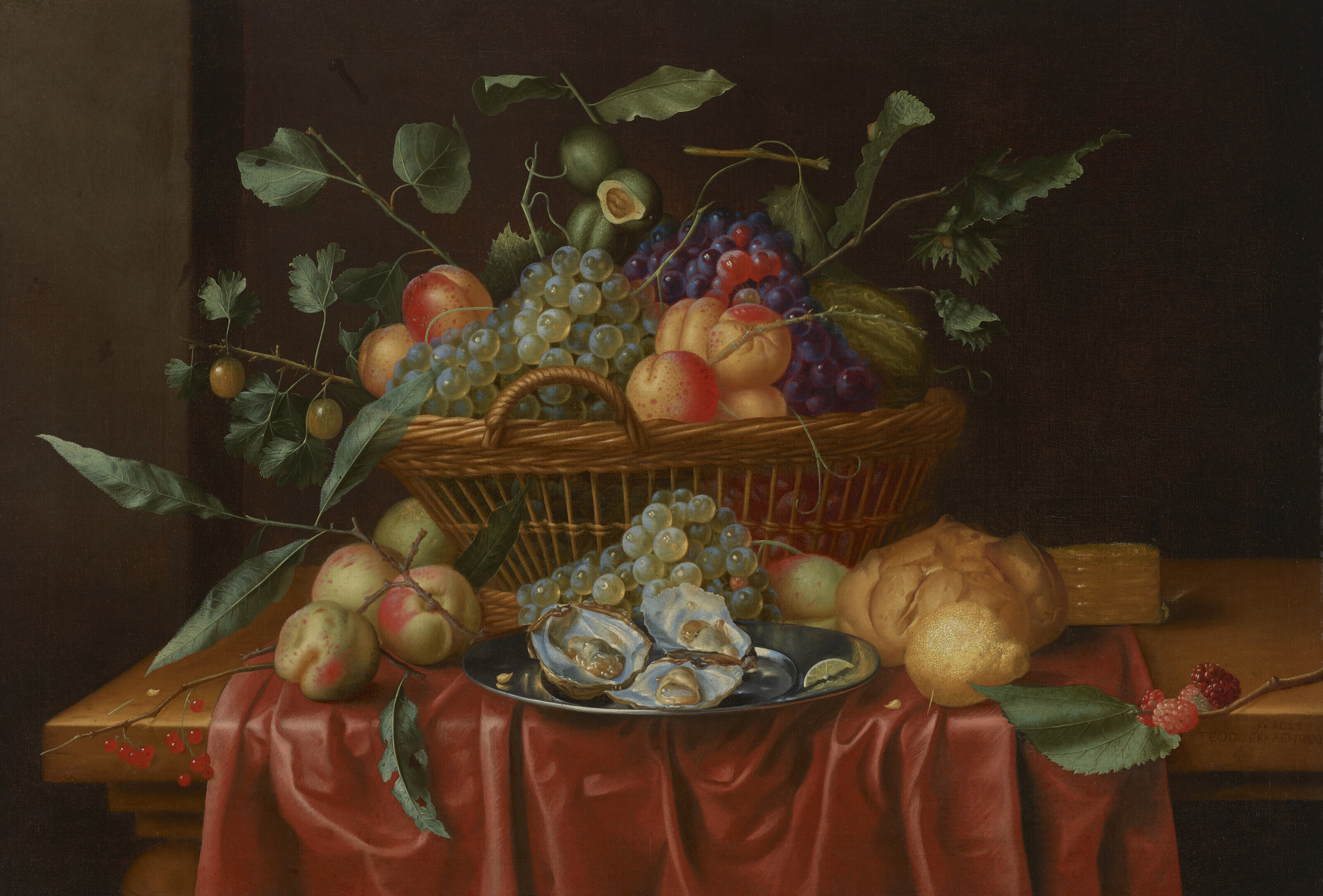
Silver plate with oysters and grapes, a basket of grapes, peaches and a melon, with other fruits and bread on a partially draped table top

Aenvanck traveled abroad probably before 1669. He likely left Antwerp again after March 1686. He died after 19 April 1690 but the place of death is not recorded.

== Work ==
Aenvanck was a specialist still life painter who painted flower, fruit, vegetable and fish still lifes. Only a few works of the artist are currently known, of which a few are signed and dated.
