= Andries Benedetti =

Flemish painter

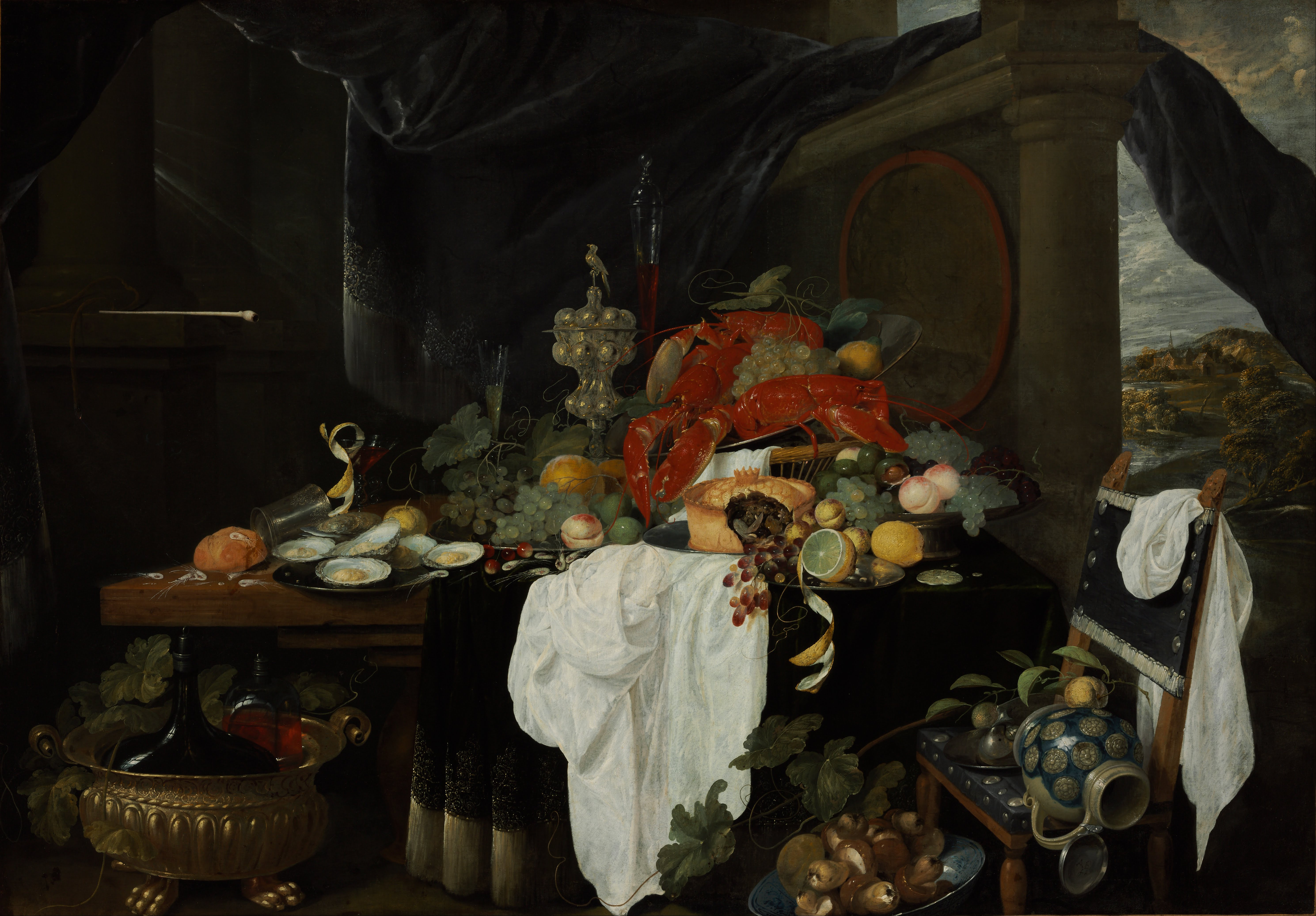
Pronk still life with fruit, oysters and lobsters

Andries Benedetti or Andrea Benedetti (1615/18 – after 1649 and before 1660) was a Flemish still life painter mainly active in Antwerp who is known for his fruit still lifes and pronkstillevens.

== Life ==
Little is known about the life of Andries Benedetti. He was the son of Italian immigrants Pietro Benedetti (died before 1638) and Maria Torres who married in the Antwerp Cathedral in 1598. His birth date was some time between 1615 and 1618. He was likely not baptized in the Cathedral of Antwerp, unlike his sister and three brothers, all born in Antwerp between 1603 and 1612 and baptized in the Cathedral of Antwerp: Johannes Franciscus (baptized on 23 September 1603), Gregorius (baptized on 2 February 1608), Christina (baptized on 12 April 1610) and Johannes Carolus (baptized on 4 November 1612). It is possible that the family moved to another parish in Antwerp after the birth of Andries.

The first firm record on the artist dates from 1636 when he was registered at the Antwerp Guild of Saint Luke as an apprentice of the obscure artist Vincent Cernevael. He trained also with Jan Davidszoon de Heem, a prominent Dutch still life painter who was active in Antwerp from the mid-1630s. He paid de Heem 50 guilders for an apprenticeship of two years starting from 13 September 1638.

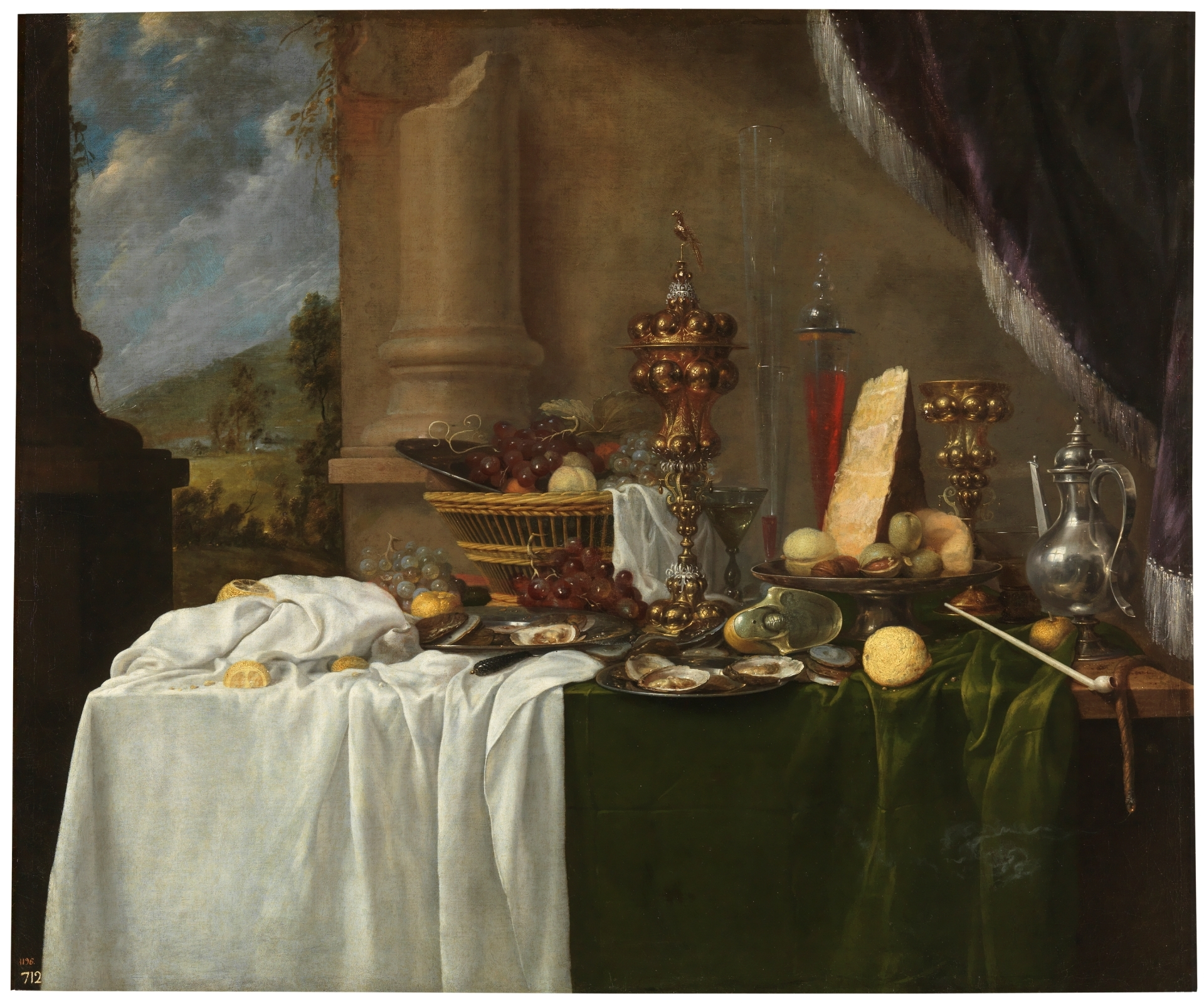
Table with desserts

He was registered as a master in the Antwerp Guild of Saint Luke in the guild year 1640–1641. The last record regarding the artist dates from 1649 when Jan Baptist Lust was registered in the Antwerp guild books as his apprentice. While a stay in Italy has been mentioned by an art historian there is no evidence for this. The still life painter Andries de Coninck whose work shows similarities with Benedetti's work was likely married to his sister Catherine.

He seemed to have enjoyed important patronage as one of his works representing a still life with oysters, lobster and fruits was recorded in 1659 in the collection of Archduke Leopold Wilhelm, the art loving Governor General of the Habsburg Netherlands. Three of his works, now in the collection of the Prado Museum, were originally in the collection of Elisabeth Farnese, the Queen of Spain by marriage to King Philip V, from where they passed to the royal collection of the Royal Palace of Aranjuez.

It is not known when or where he died but it is believed that he died some time between September 1649 and 1660, possibly in Alkmaar in the Dutch Republic.

== Work ==
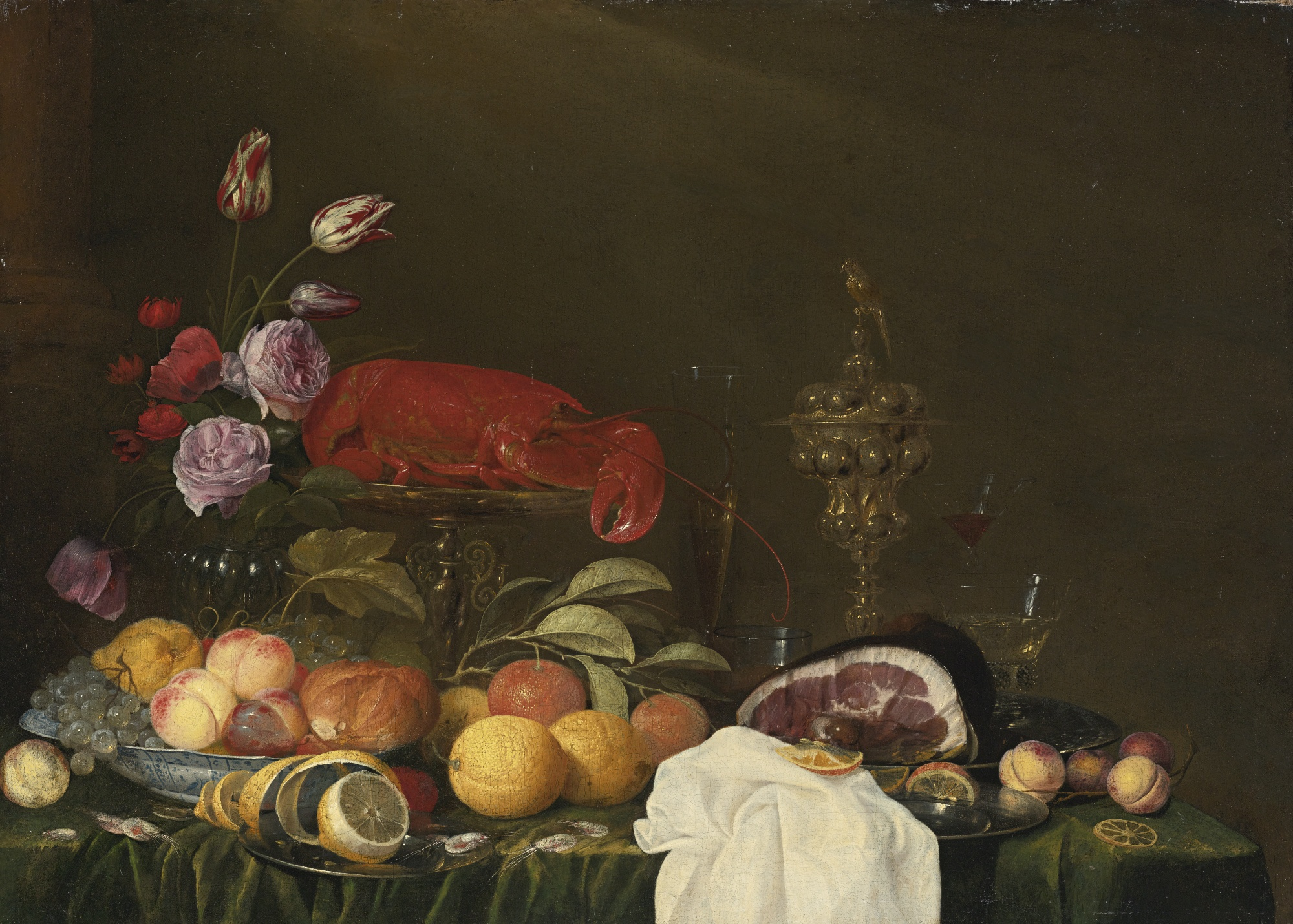
Still life with a vase of roses and tulips, a ham on a pewter plate

Andries Benedetti was a still life specialist who is known for his fruit still lifes and pronkstillevens, the sumptuous still lifes that were popular in Flanders and the Dutch Republic from the 1640s.

His work was indebted to de Heem's works in the disposition of objects although in Benedetti's work there is a greater profusion of objects. Benedetti followed the innovations of de Heem, by creating sumptuous compositions, which combine the colourful Flemish palette with the more muted tones popular in Dutch still life painting. Beneditti applied the paint less thickly than de Heem.

Because of the close similarities in their output, Benedetti's paintings have been confused for a long time with those of de Heem. Only after the anagram " A b fe" was identified on several still lifes in the collection of the Kunsthistorisches Museum (Vienna) was it possible to attribute the works to Benedetti.

His works influenced the work of the Italian Pier Francesco Cittadini and his presumed brother-in-law Andries de Coninck.
