= David Davidsz de Heem =

Dutch Golden Age painter

David Davidsz de Heem (1570–1632) was a Dutch Golden Age painter.

== Biography ==
David Davidze de Heem was born and died in Utrecht. According to Houbraken, he was the father of Jan Davidsz de Heem who made still lifes in the manner of his father and both were living and working together in Antwerp in 1660. Houbraken quoted Cornelis de Bie's poem which claimed that paintings by the father and son hung side by side and one couldn't tell them apart. Houbraken misquoted the poem however, when he assumed that the "father and son" referred to in this context were Jan Davidsz de Heem and his father.

== David Davidsz de Heem - the Elder, or the Younger ==
De Bie probably meant Jan Davidsz de Heem and his son Cornelis de Heem, since those are the only two names he mentions in the two pages he devotes to the De Heem family. David Davidze de Heem the Elder had died well before 1660, but if he had had a son named David, then this son could have been the son meant instead of Cornelis. No definite attributions to this younger David exist, but the poem did state that no one could tell their paintings apart, so presumably all such paintings are currently attributed to Jan Davidsz. According to Van der Aa a David de Heem the Elder was an excellent painter of flowers, fruit, gold, silver, and crystal. His son David Davidsze de Heem (brother to Jan Davidsz) became a member of the Utrecht Guild of St. Luke in 1668 and a David Davidsze entered as a master in the Antwerp Guild of St. Luke in 1694. He is not to be confused with Cornelis de Heem's son David Cornelisz de Heem.

De Heem family tree

David de Heem the Elder; 1570-1632
Jan Davidsz. de Heem; 1606-1683	David Davidsz de Heem
David de Heem; 1628-?	Cornelis de Heem; 1631-1695	Jan Janszoon de Heem; 1650-1695
David Cornelisz de Heem; 1663-1701
