= Imbaba Airport =

Coordinates: 30°04′30″N 31°11′30″E

Embaba Airport (ICAO: HEEM) was a pilot training airport in the Cairo suburb of Giza that was closed in 2002, because of safety concerns due to buildings encroaching on airport property. For a number of years, the airport was home to Egyptian Gliding Institute.

A theme park project was approved, and construction began in 2009. The airport is now gone, with the theme park and apartment blocks replacing it.
