= Cornelis de Heem =

Dutch painter

Cornelis de Heem (8 April 1631 (baptized) – 17 May 1695 (buried)) was a still-life painter associated with both Flemish Baroque and Dutch Golden Age painting. He was a member of a large family of still-life specialists, of which his father, Jan Davidszoon de Heem (1606–1684), was the most significant.

Cornelis was baptised in Leiden on 8 April 1631, and moved with his family to Antwerp in 1636. He appears to have been trained by his father in Antwerp, who, like him, was born in the Dutch Republic but died in the Southern Netherlands. Jan's subsequent career, like many painters—especially after the Peace of Westphalia in 1648—moved fluidly between the two traditionally-connected areas of the north and south Low Countries. He became a member of the Antwerp painters' guild in 1660, and from 1667 until the late 1680s he was variously active in Utrecht, IJsselstein, and The Hague. It is often not easy to distinguish the works of the different members of the family, which included his brother Jan Jansz., nephew Jan Jansz. II, and son David Cornelisz. (1663 – after 1718), who all painted mostly flower and fruit pieces in a similar style and probably often collaborated. Cornelis's works, however, tend to be small, display a preference for strong blues, and, over time, shifted away from the painterly style preferred by his father. He died in Antwerp, aged 64.

De Heem family tree

David de Heem the Elder; 1570-1632
Jan Davidsz. de Heem; 1606-1683 | David Davidsz de Heem
David de Heem; 1628-? | Cornelis de Heem; 1631-1695 | Jan Janszoon de Heem; 1650-1695
David Cornelisz de Heem; 1663-1701

Notes:

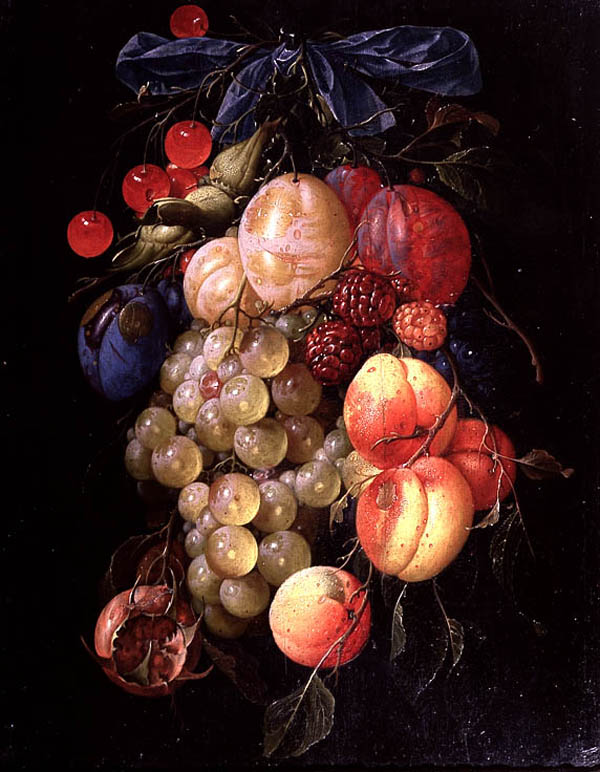

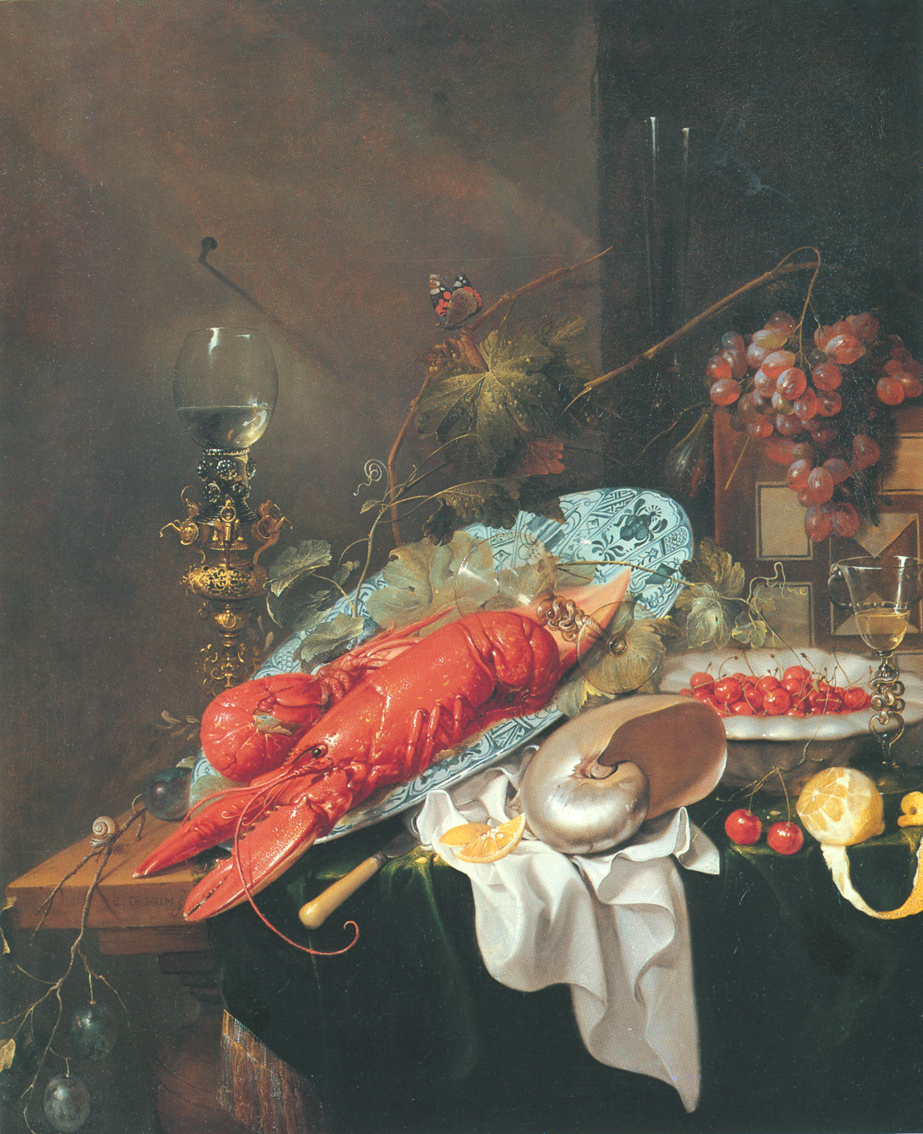
Still Life with Lobster, painted in the second half of the 17th century

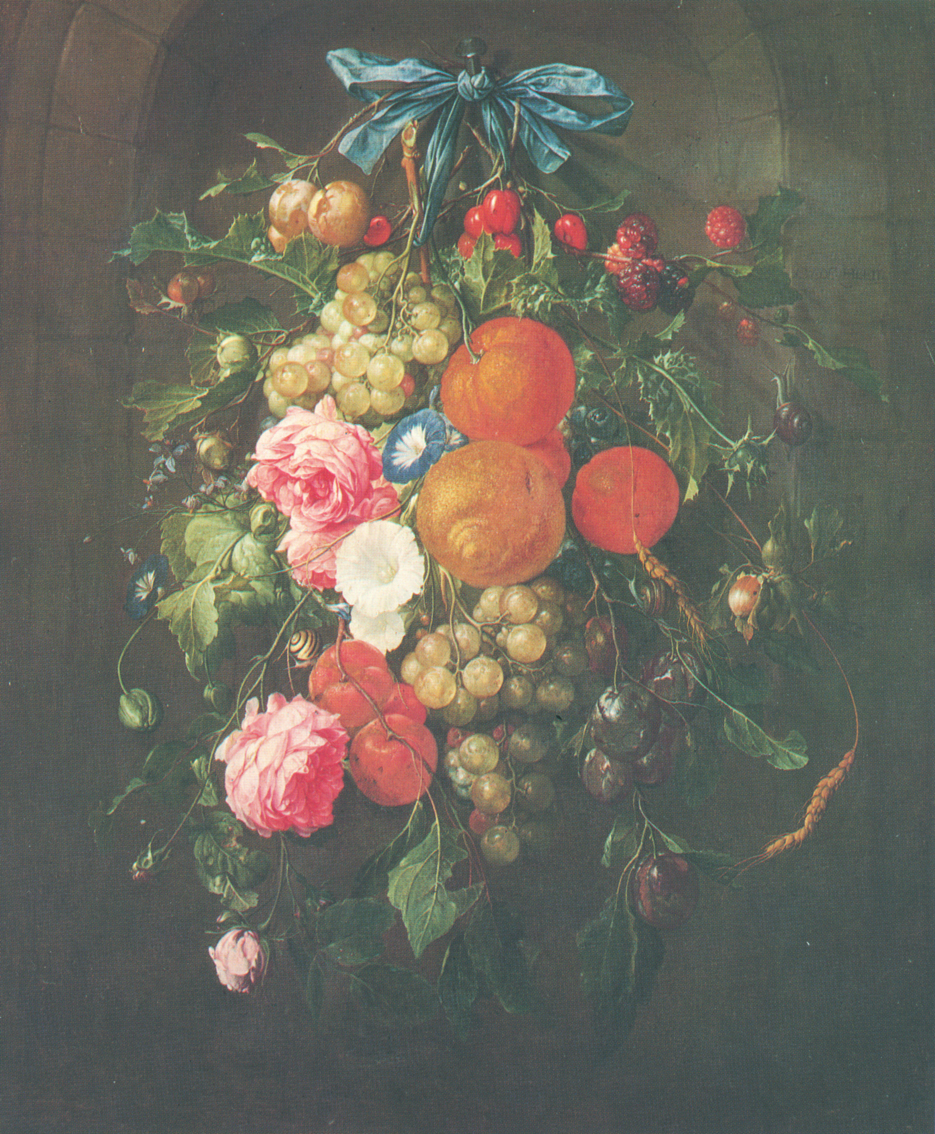

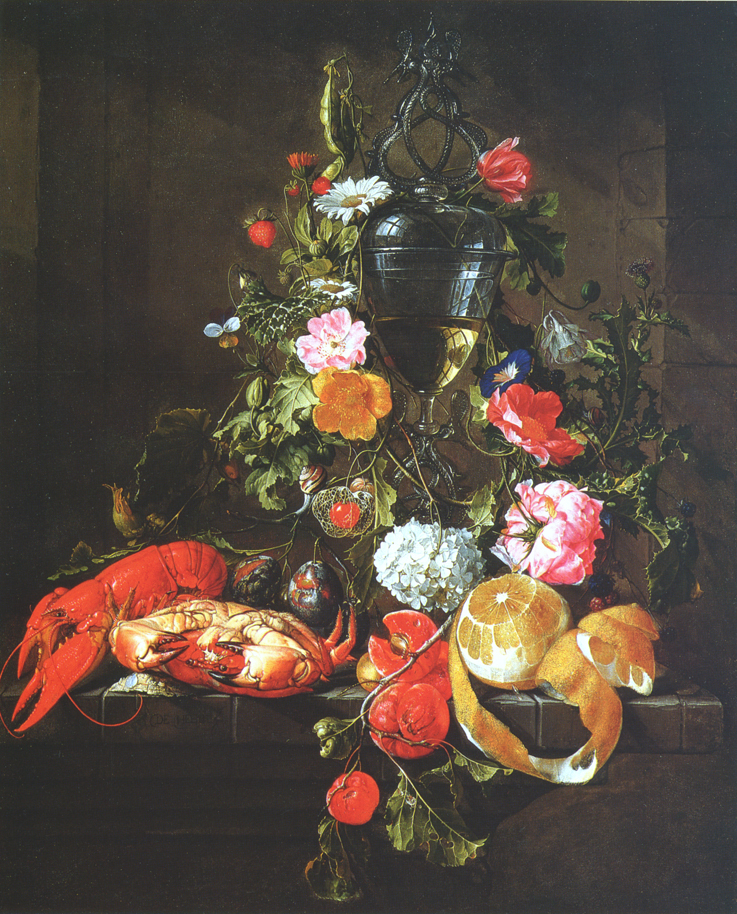

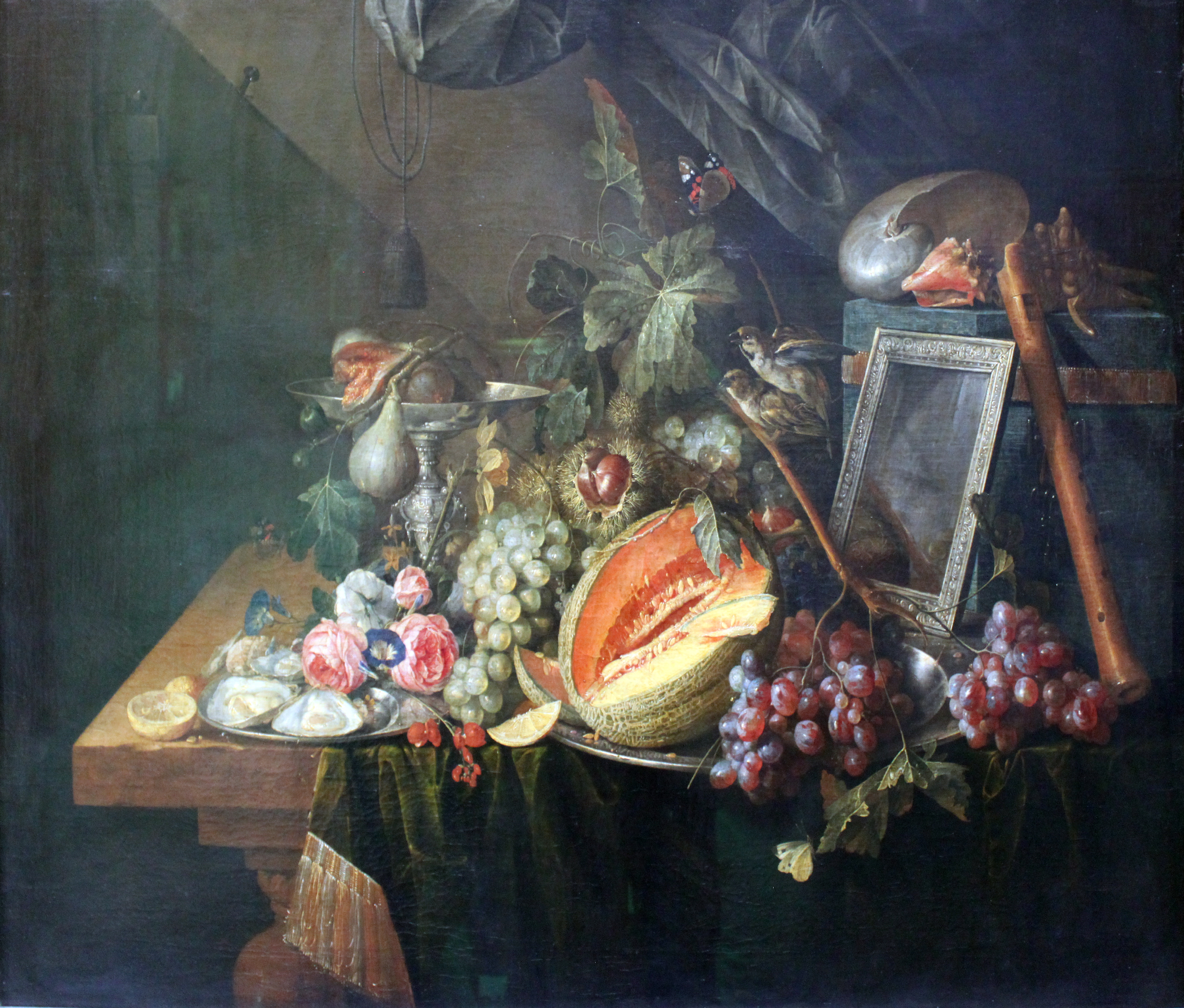
Pageantry Still Life with copulating sparrows, 1657, Städelsches Kunstinstitut
