= David Cornelisz de Heem =

Dutch Golden Age painter

David Cornelisz. de Heem (1663, Antwerp – 1701, The Hague), was a Dutch Golden Age painter.

== Biography ==
According to the RKD he is also known as David Cornelisz de Heem III. He was the son of Cornelis de Heem and moved with his parents to Utrecht in 1667. He painted in the family tradition started by Jan Davidsz de Heem and lived in the Hague 1676–1701. He became a member of the Antwerp Guild of St. Luke in 1693 though he was probably still living in the Hague.

De Heem family tree

David de Heem the Elder; 1570-1632
Jan Davidsz. de Heem; 1606-1683	David Davidsz de Heem
David de Heem; 1628-?	Cornelis de Heem; 1631-1695	Jan Janszoon de Heem; 1650-1695
David Cornelisz de Heem; 1663-1701
