= Jan Janszoon de Heem =

Dutch Golden Age still-life painter

Jan Janszoon de Heem (bapt. 2 July 1650, Antwerp – after 1695) was a Dutch Golden Age still-life painter and the son of Jan Davidszoon de Heem (1606–1684) and the half-brother of Cornelis de Heem (1631–1695). This family of still-life specialists, of which father Jan Davidszoon de Heem is the most significant, had a strong impact on the genre throughout the north and south Netherlands.

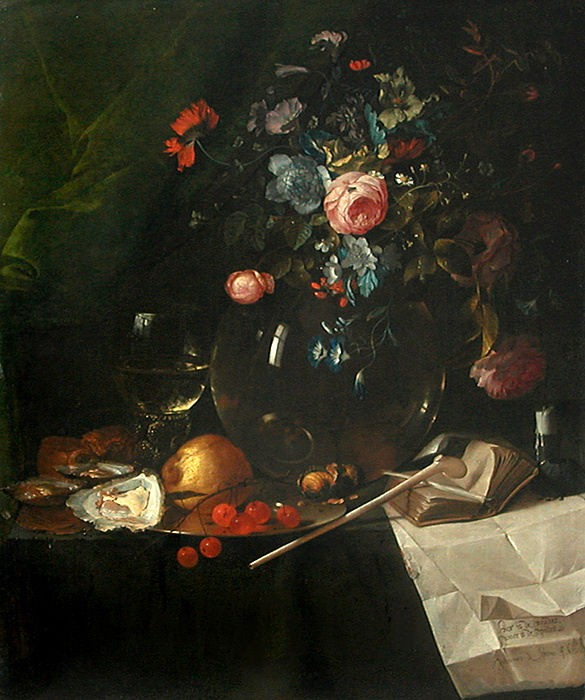
Jan Janszoon de Heem, still life (1685).

Jan was baptised in Antwerp on 2 July 1650, but was trained by his father in Utrecht from 1667 to 1672. His works, in fact, are nearly indistinguishable from his father's, and the fact that they both signed them as J de Heem have meant that many paintings in major collections attributed to Jan Davidszoon are actually by Jan Janszoon. Furthermore, many of his works are now believed to have been created by his son, Jan Janszoon de Heem II. The RKD, however, describes his capacity as a (still life) painter as under discussion, notes that no work can be attributed to him with certainty, and that his name is not mentioned in the registers of the Guild.

De Heem family tree

David de Heem the Elder; 1570-1632
Jan Davidsz. de Heem; 1606-1683	David Davidsz de Heem
David de Heem; 1628-?	Cornelis de Heem; 1631-1695	Jan Janszoon de Heem; 1650-1695
David Cornelisz de Heem; 1663-1701
