= Jan Davidsz. de Heem =

Dutch painter (1606–1684)

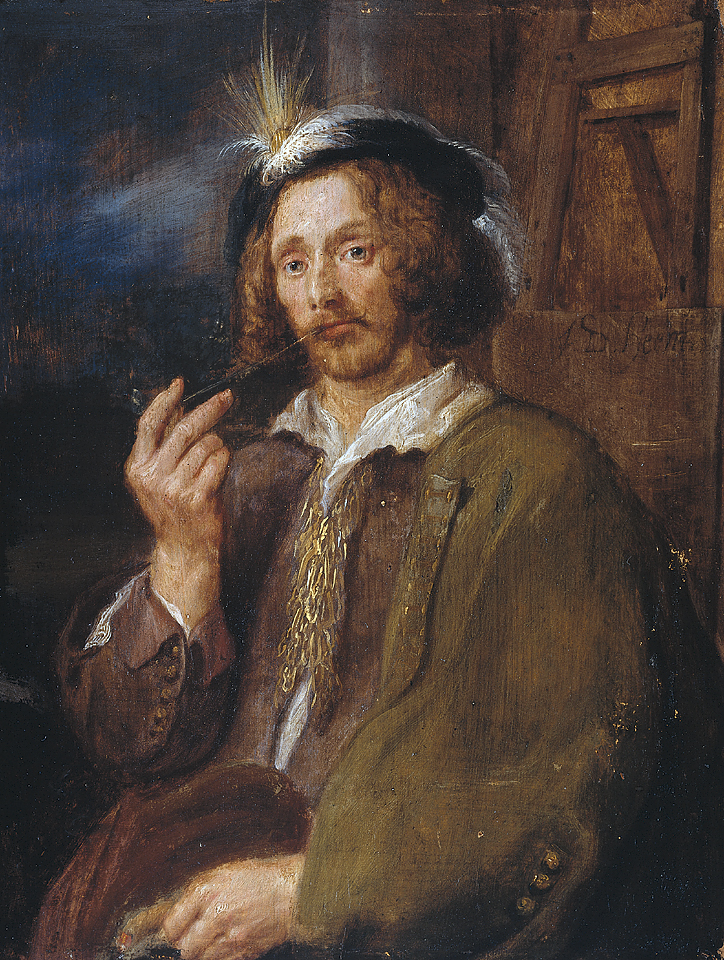
- Portrait of Jan Davidsz. de Heem. 1630s. Circle of Adriaen Brouwer.
- Born: Jan Davidsz. de Heem; 17 April 1606; Utrecht, Netherlands
- Died: 26 April 1684 (aged 78); Antwerp
- Education: David de Heem the Elder, Balthasar van der Ast
- Known for: Painting
- Movement: Dutch Golden Age painting Flemish Baroque painting
- Spouse: Alette van Weede († 1643) Anna Catherina Ruckers (from 1644-?)
- Children: 9, including David Janszoon de Heem (29 November 1628 - † ?); Cornelis de Heem (1631–1695); Jan de Heem (1650 - † ?)

Jan Davidsz. de Heem or in-full Jan Davidszoon de Heem, also called Johannes de Heem or Johannes van Antwerpen or Jan Davidsz de Hem (c. 17 April 1606 in Utrecht – before 26 April 1684 in Antwerp), was a still life painter who was active in Utrecht and Antwerp. He is a major representative of that genre in both Dutch and Flemish Baroque painting.

== Early life and education ==
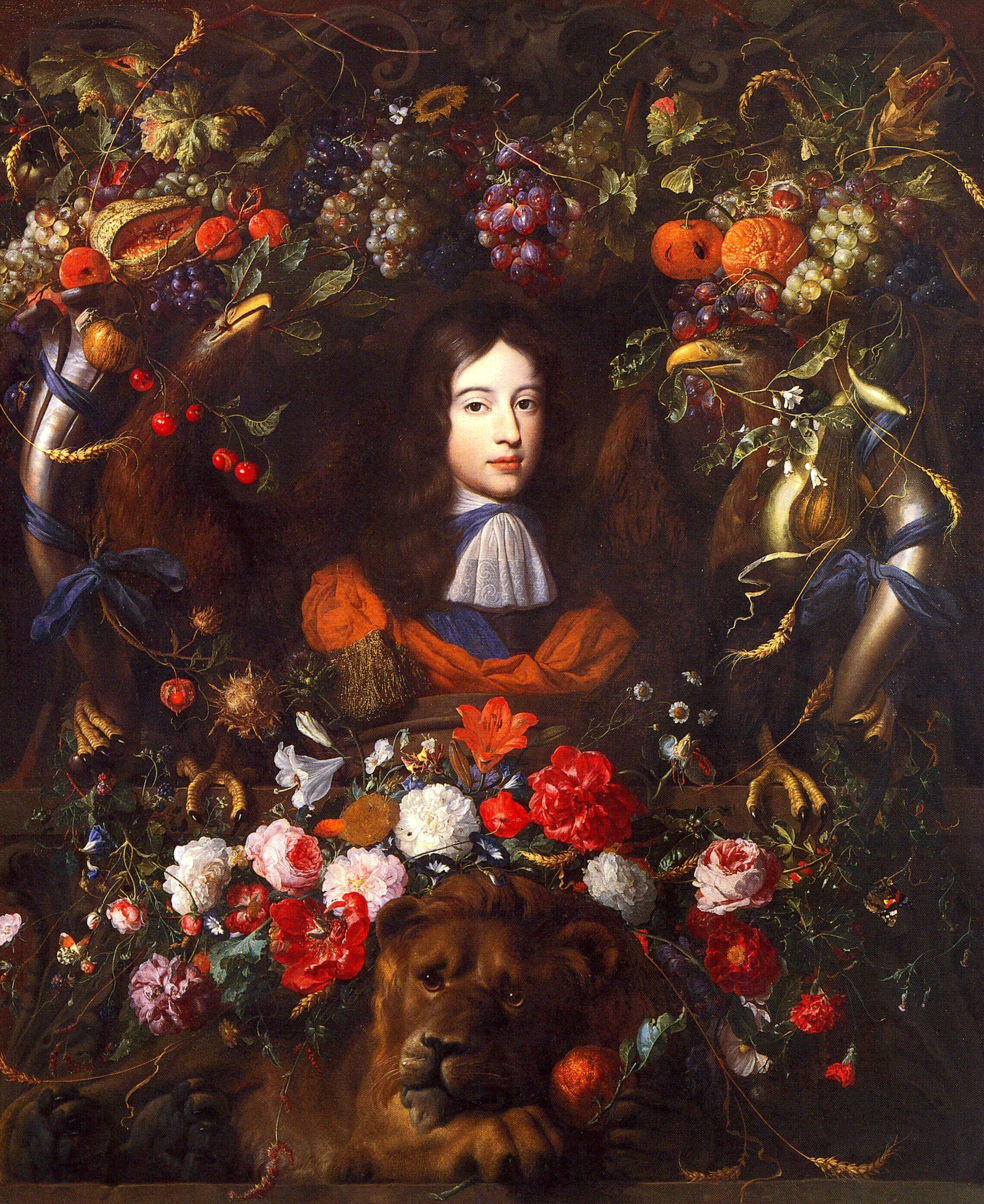
Portrait of William III of England, aged 10, in a flower garland, with House of Orange symbols, a war booty taken to France 1795, where it remained

De Heem was born in Utrecht, the Dutch Republic in 1606 as Johannes van Antwerpen to David de Heem the Elder (1570–1631), a painter. He had a younger brother David (1610 – after 1669). An unknown brother of the father had a son, Jan or Johannes de Heem (c. 1603 – probably after 1659), who also became a painter of still lifes. De Heem studied first under his father, then under Balthasar van der Ast. "Davidsz." is a patronym referring to his father's name, David. He lived in Leiden from about 1625 to 1629, where he studied in 1629 under David Bailly (1584 – c. 1657).

== Career ==
De Heem moved to the Southern Netherlands and in 1635 or 1636 joined the Guild of Saint Luke of Antwerp. He became a burgher of that city in 1637. However he was often absent, as attested by the duties he had to pay for this. His remarkable talent gained him a considerable reputation. He could hardly satisfy the demand. De Heem was considered one of the greatest painters of his time. He was well paid and a portrait of Prince William III surrounded by a cartouche of flowers and fruit (see image at right) was sold for 2000 guilders, one of the highest prices ever paid for a painting during the Dutch Golden Age.

His sons worked together with him in his workshop on the commissions for new paintings. He retouched their work and put his signature on the paintings.

He remained in Antwerp until 1667, when he moved back to Utrecht, where records trace his presence from 1668 to 1671. He left Utrecht in 1671 when French troops were approaching the city. It is not known when he finally returned to Antwerp, but his death there is recorded in the guild books.

Vase of Flowers, 1660, part of Baron Lionel Nathan de Rothschild collection. It was purchased by the National Gallery of Art in 1961.

== Personal life ==
De Heem married twice, first with Alette van Weede with whom he had three surviving children on her death in 1643. He married a second time in 1644 with Anna Catherina Ruckers with whom he had six more children. Three of his sons became painters: from the first marriage, David Janszoon de Heem (b. 29 November 1628) and Cornelis de Heem (1631–1695), and from the second marriage Jan de Heem (b. 1650). Cornelis de Heem, in turn, had a son who also became a painter: David Corneliszoon de Heem (1663–1718).

Apart from his sons, de Heem had several apprentices: Michiel Verstylen, Alexander Coosemans, Thomas de Klerck, Lenaert Rougghe, Theodor Aenvanck, Andries Benedetti, Elias van den Broeck, Jacob Marrel, Hendrik Schoock and Abraham Mignon.

== Work ==
De Heem was one of the greatest painters of still lifes in the Netherlands, combining a brilliance and harmony of colour along with an accurate rendering of objects: flowers, in all their variety; European and tropical fruits; lobsters and oysters; butterflies and moths; stone and metal; snails and sea shells.

His still lifes included fruit pieces, vanitas still lifes and flower pieces, but he is best known for his ornate or sumptuous still lifes, the so-called 'pronkstillevens'. Some of his works are displays of abundance; others, only a festoon or a nosegay.

Often he would convey a moral or illustrate a motto: a snake lying coiled under grass; a skull on plants in bloom. Gold and silver cups or tankards are suggestive of the vanity of earthly possessions. Salvation is seen allegorically as a chalice amid blossoms, and death as a crucifix in a wreath. Sometimes de Heem painted, alone or with others, Madonnas or portraits in garlands of fruit or flowers.

His signature varied: his initials (J. De Heem f.), or Johannes (IOANNES DE HEEM F.), or his father's name adjoined to his own (J. D. De Heem f.). Occasionally he provided a date (such as A. i65i), especially with his best work.

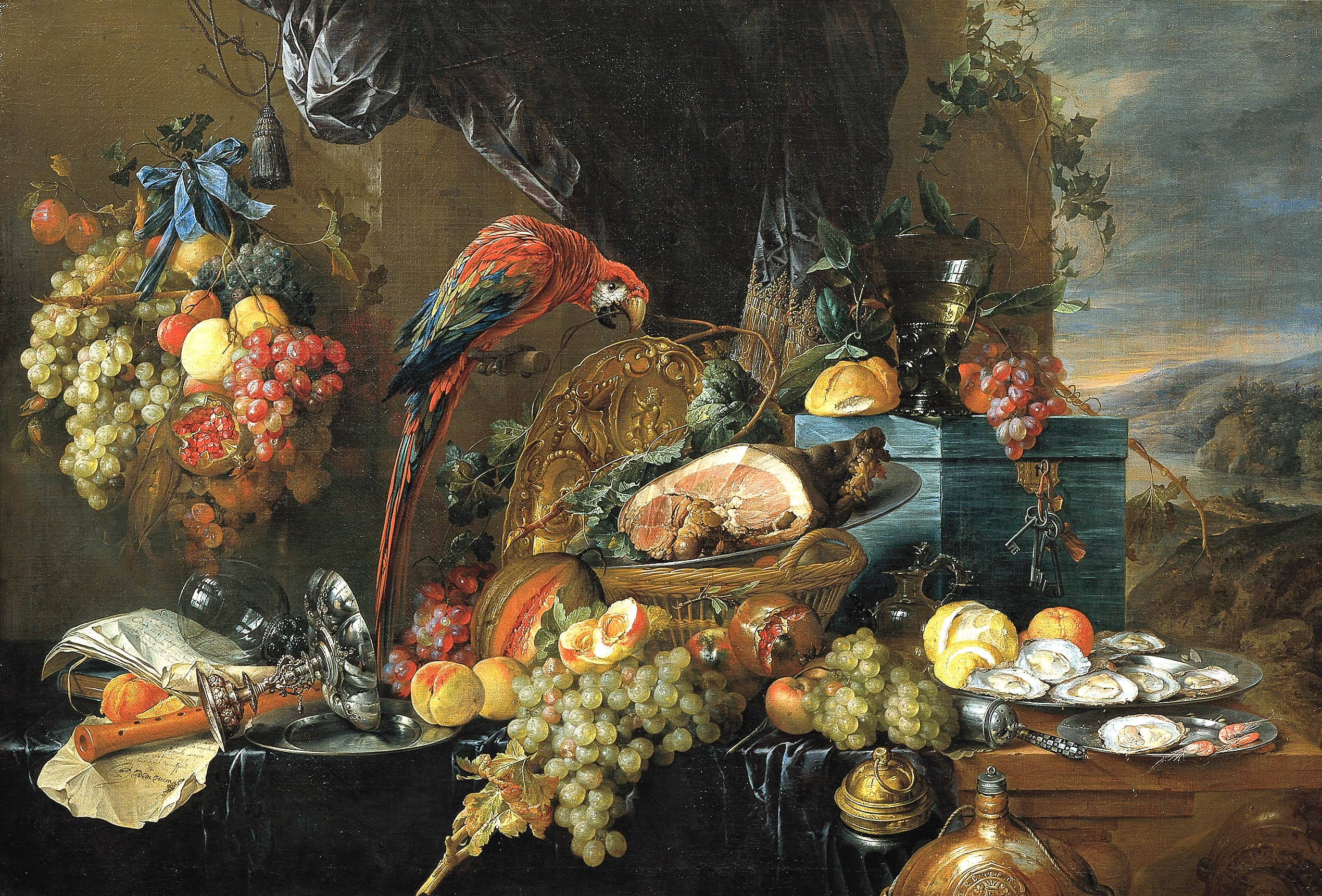
A Richly Laid Table with Parrots, c. 1650

== Collections ==
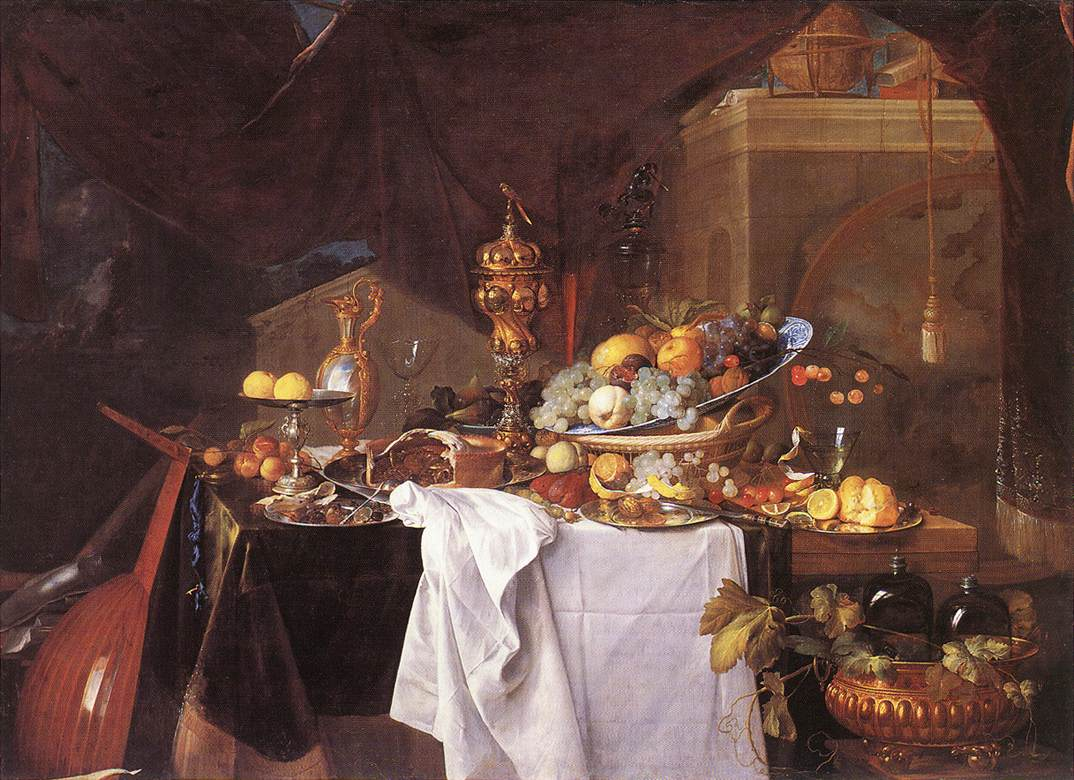
A Table of Desserts

Of the one hundred or more of his pictures seen in European galleries, only 18 are dated. An early work shows a chased tankard with a bottle, a silver cup and a lemon on a marble table, dated 1640, in the Rijksmuseum in Amsterdam. A similar work of 1645, with the addition of fruit, flowers and a distant landscape, is at Longford Castle. A chalice in a wreath, with a radiant bouquet among wheat sheaves, grapes and flowers, is a masterpiece of 1648 in the Belvedere of Vienna. A wreath around a life-sized Madonna, dated 1650, in the museum of Berlin, shows that de Heem could paint brightly and harmoniously on a large scale. The Prado Museum owns a Table dated around 1651 and the Thyssen-Bornemisza Museum houses Flowers in a glass Vase with Fruit circa 1665.

In the Alte Pinakothek in Munich is a celebrated work of 1653 in which creepers mingle beautifully with gourds, blackberries, orange, myrtle and peach, and further enlivened with butterflies, moths and beetles. A landscape with a blooming rose tree, a jug of strawberries, a selection of fruit, and a marble bust of Pan, dated 1655, is in the Hermitage in St Petersburg. Some of his works are kept at the Royal Museums of Fine Arts of Belgium in Brussels. A 1645 still life of a feast of fruit and lobster is in the gallery at the Allen Memorial Art Museum in Oberlin, Ohio. A simple still life of pewter goblets can be seen in the Barber Institute, University of Birmingham, UK.

== Gallery ==
Jan Davidsz. de Heem 's paintings

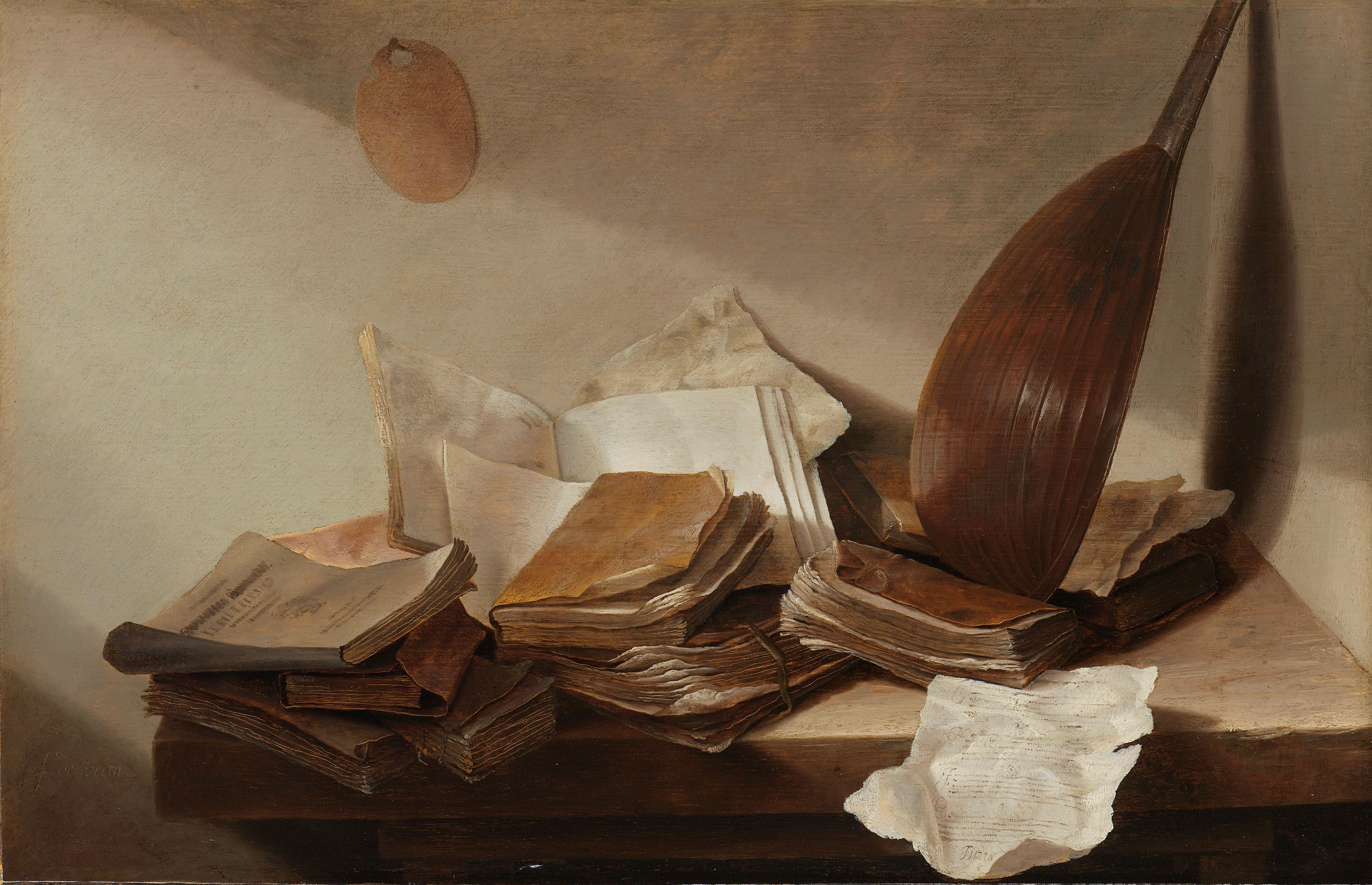
Still life with books and a lute, 1628, Rijksmuseum, Amsterdam

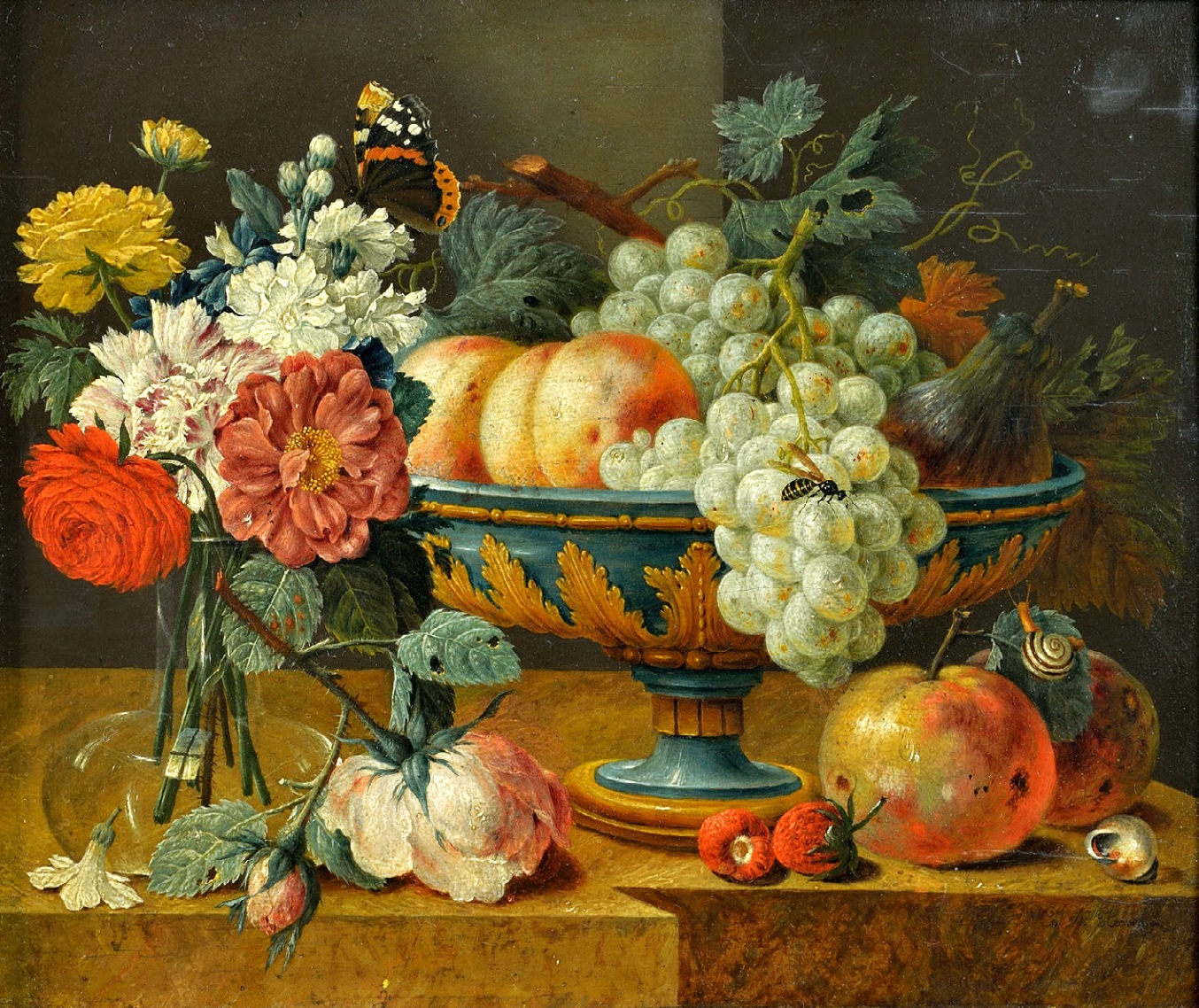
Fruit bowl with flowers, first half of 17th century, National Museum in Poznań

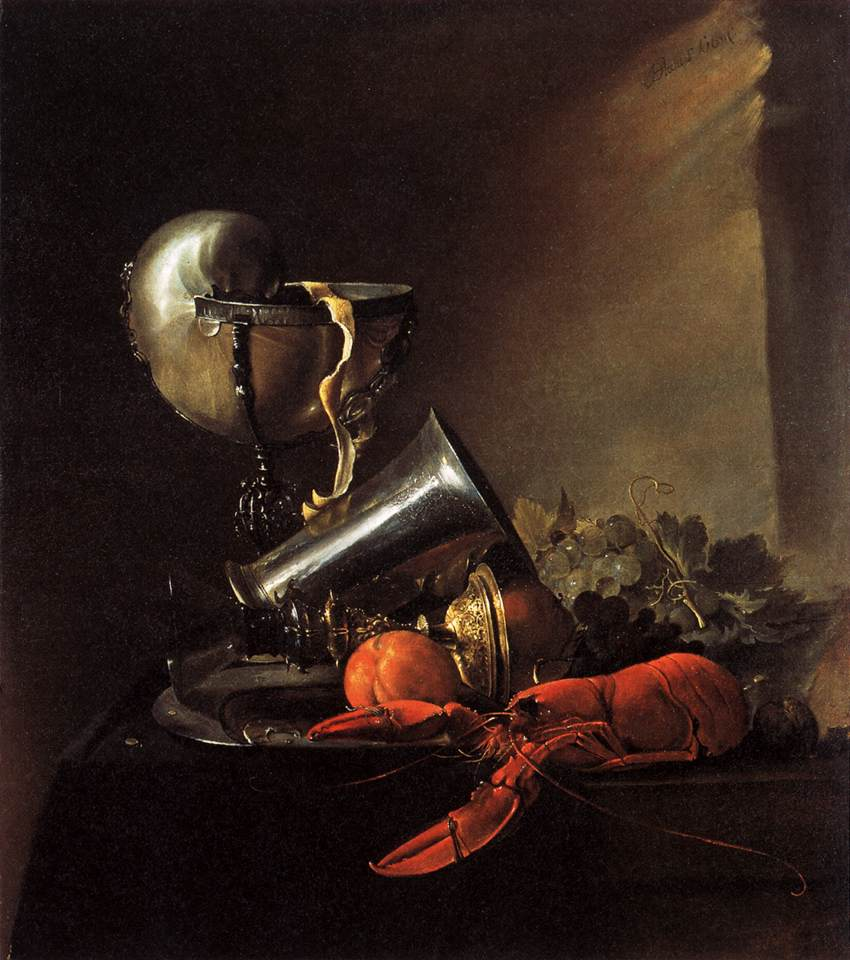
Still-Life with Lobster and Nautilus Cup, 1634, Staatsgalerie Stuttgart

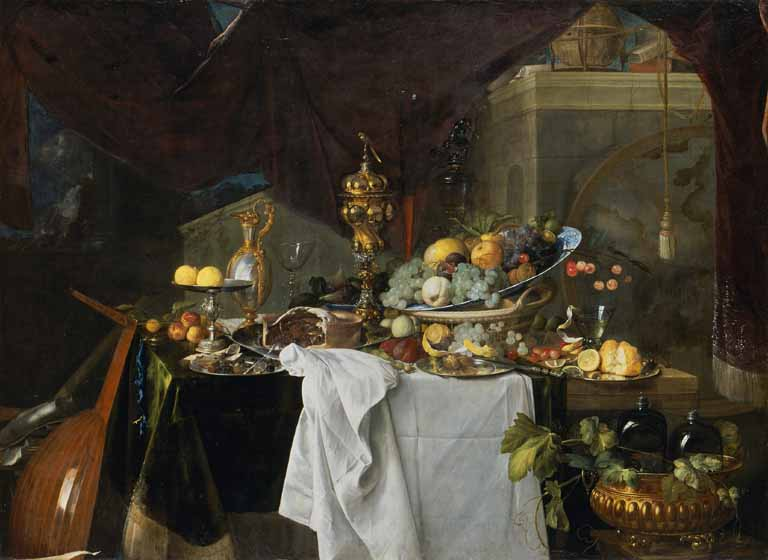
A Table of Desserts, 1640, Louvre Museum, Paris

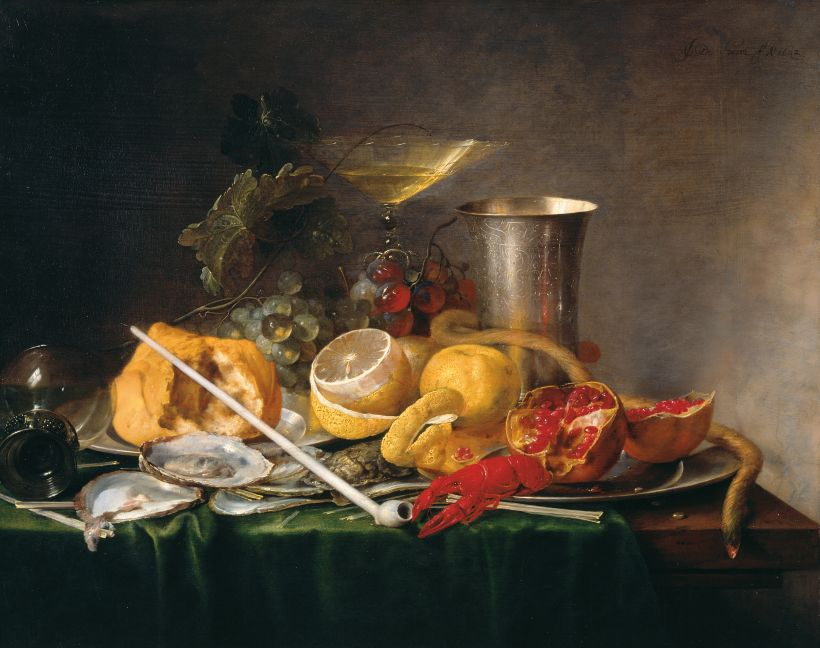
Still-Life, Breakfast with Champagne Glass and Pipe, 1642, Residenzgalerie, Salzburg

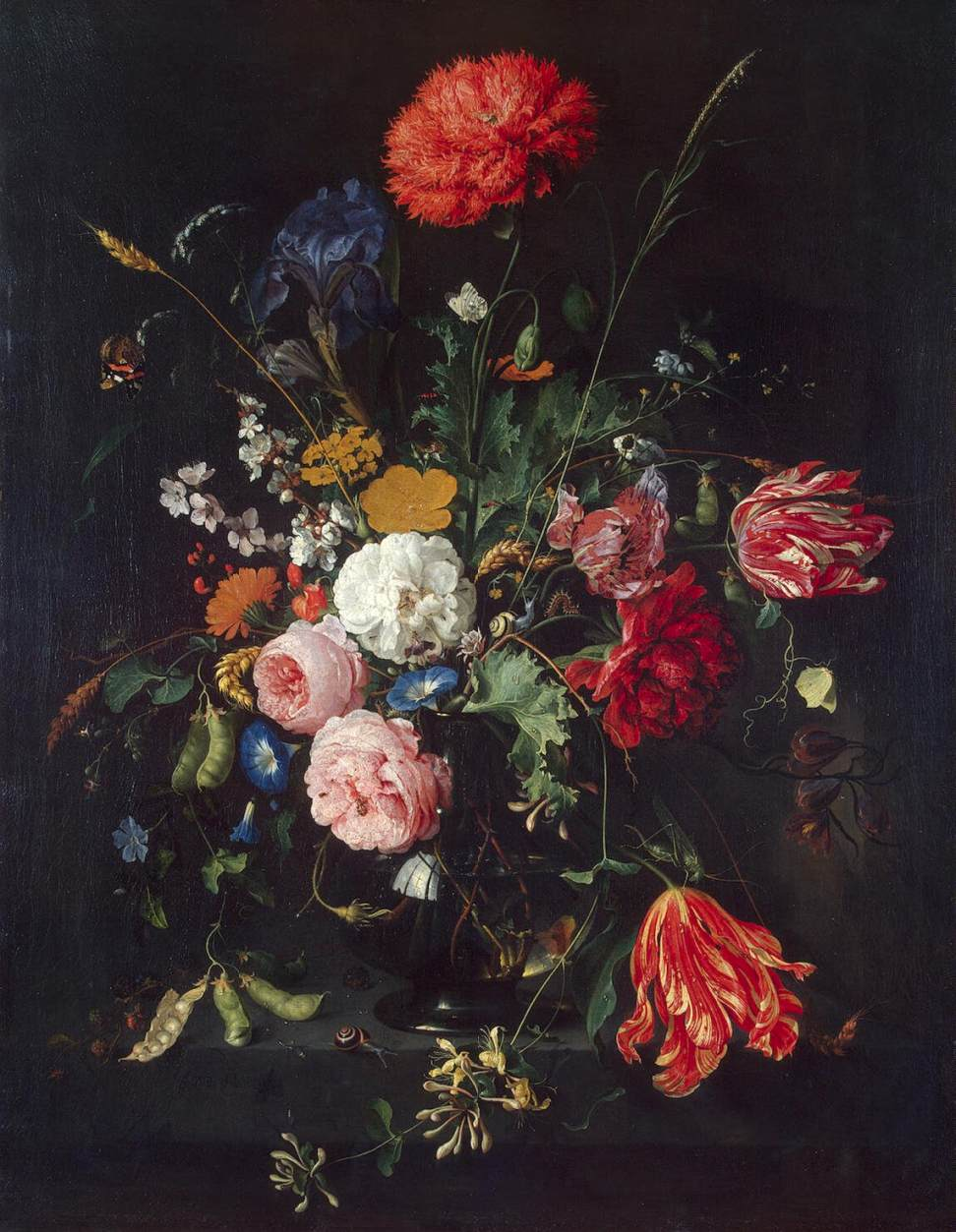
Flowers in a Vase, once part of the collection of Count Karl von Cobenzl in Brussels, bought by Catherine the Great in 1768. Now in Hermitage Museum, Saint Petersburg.

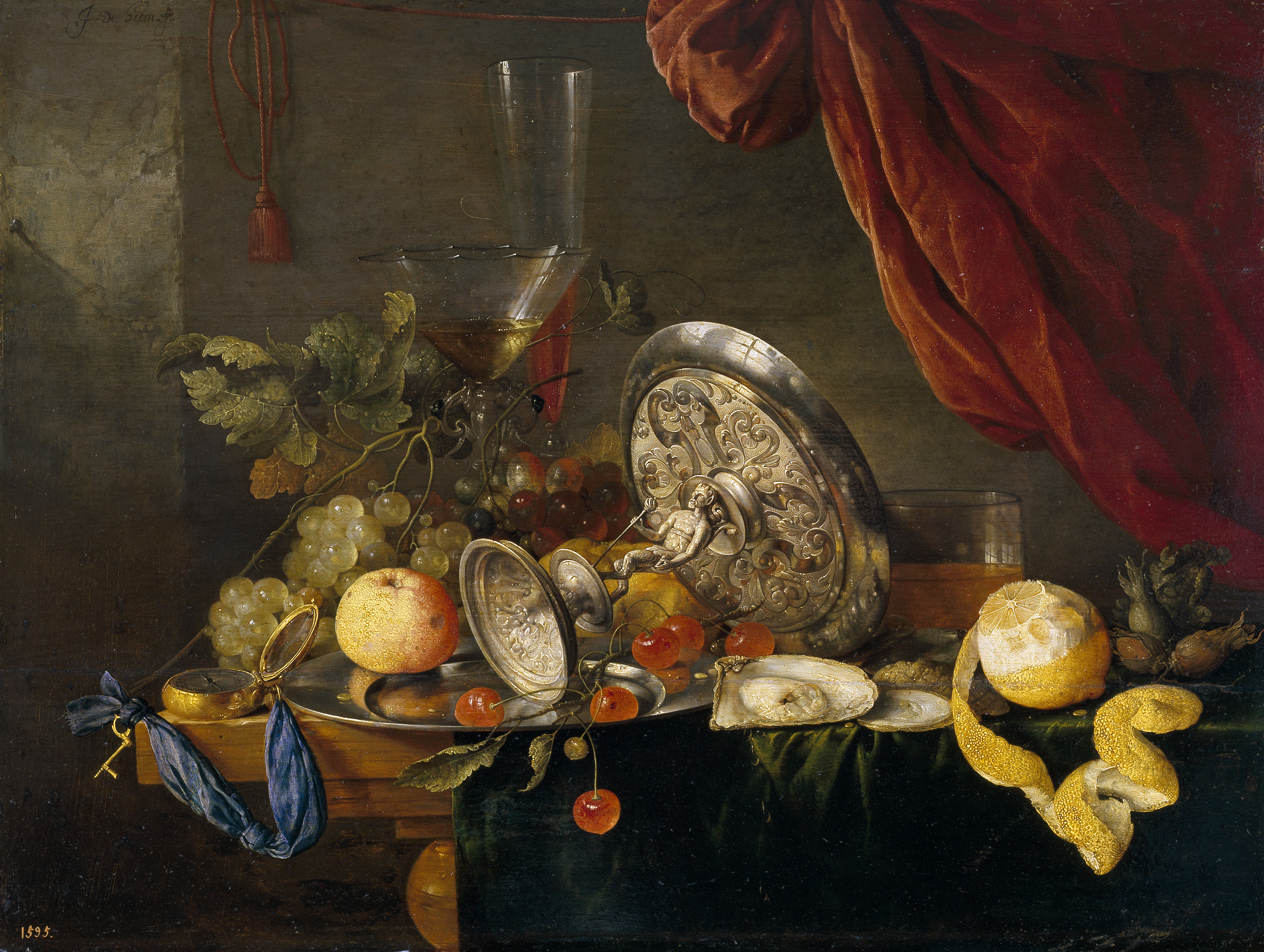
Table. Museo del Prado, Madrid.

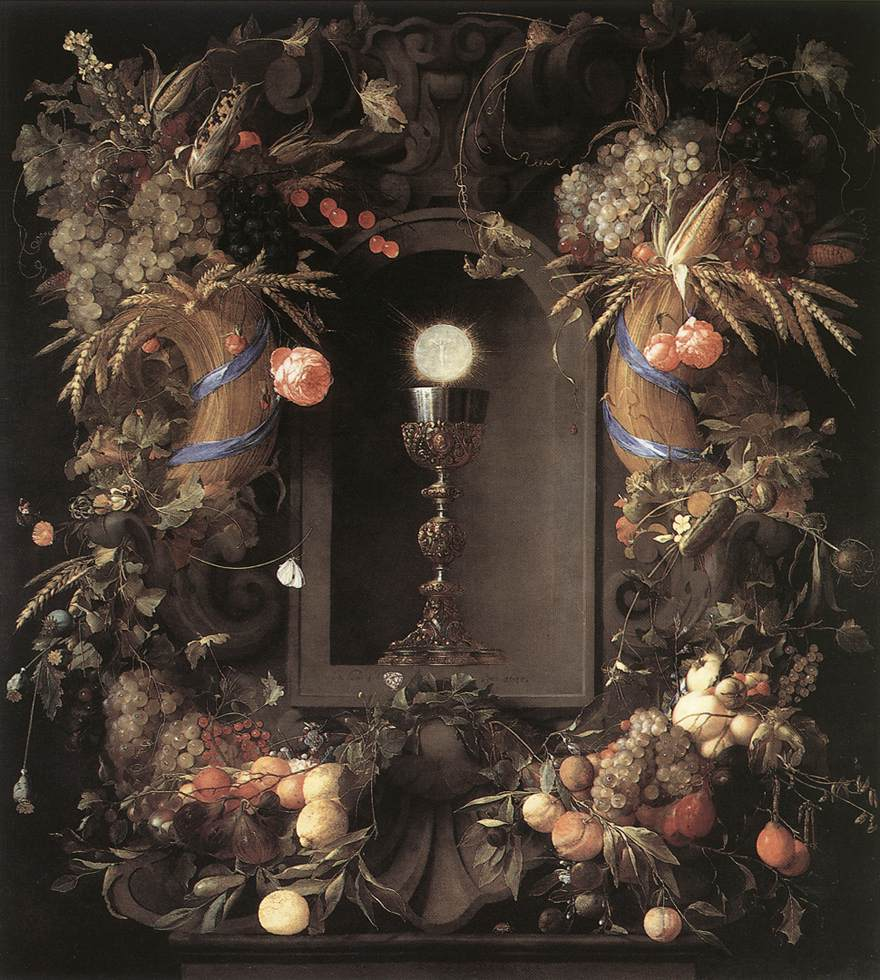
Eucharist in Fruit Wreath, 1648, Kunsthistorisches Museum, Vienna

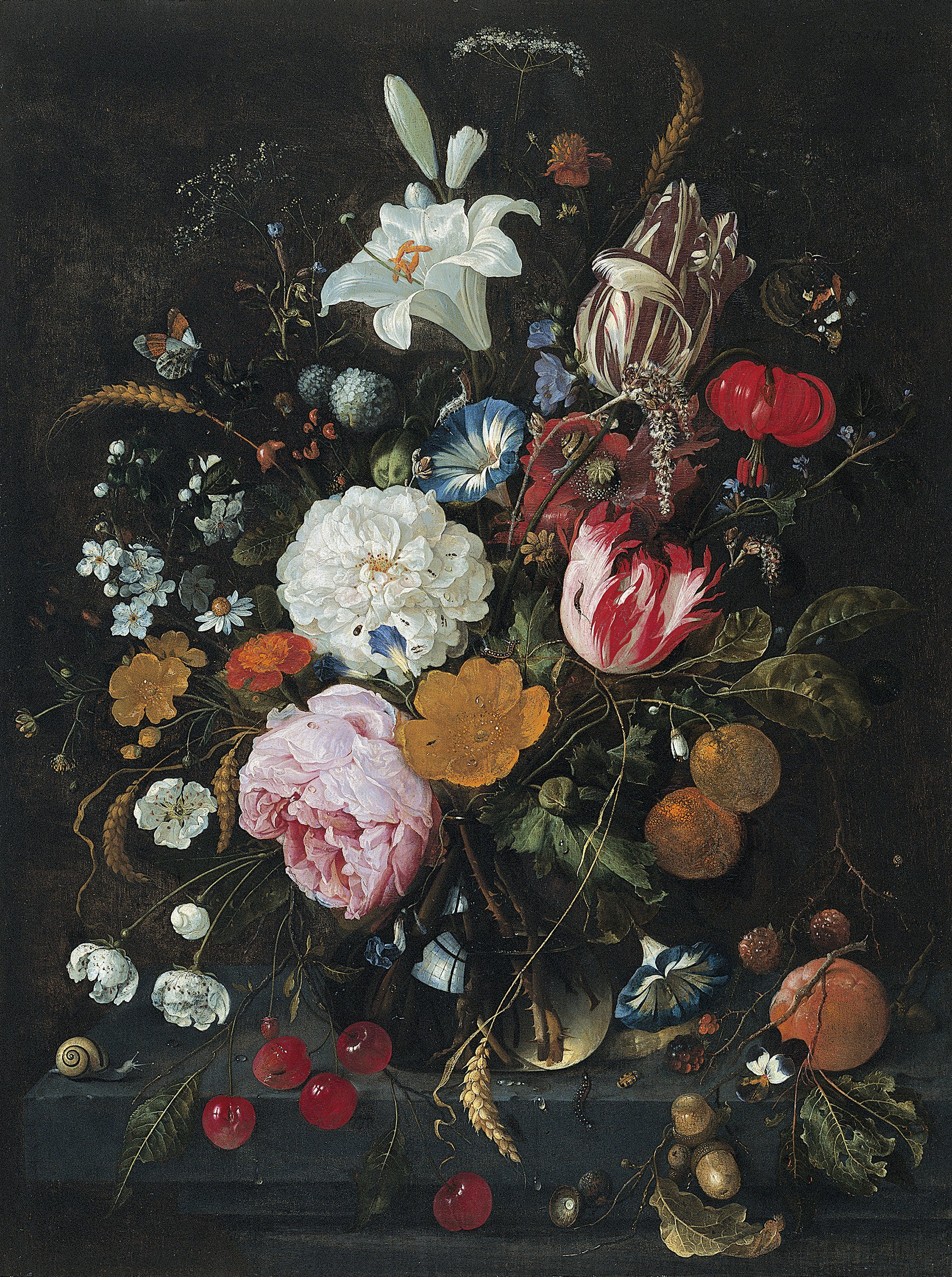
Flowers in a glass Vase with Fruit, 1665, Thyssen-Bornemisza Museum, Madrid

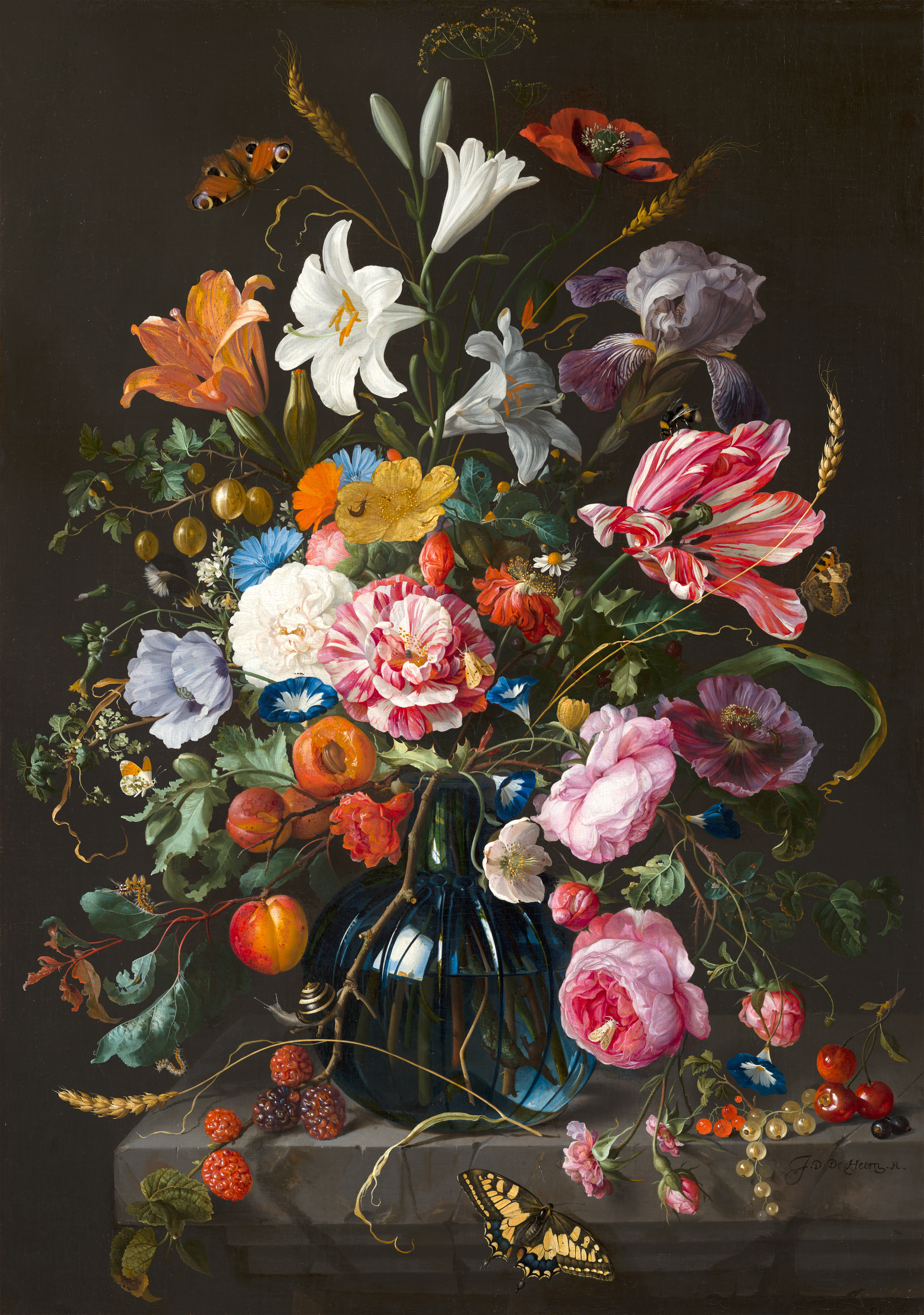
Vase of flowers, 1670, Mauritshuis, The Hague
